= Indira Nagar, Lucknow =

Residential area in Uttar Pradesh, India

Indira Nagar Indira Nagar Colony
- Neighbourhood
- Location in Lucknow, India
- Coordinates: 26.8833°N 80.9833°E
- Country: India
- State: Uttar Pradesh
- Metro: Lucknow
- Founder: U.P. Housing and Development Board

Government
  - Type: State Government
  - Body: U.P. Housing and Development Board(Awas Vikas Parishad)

Area
  - Total: 17.44 km^{2} (6.73 sq mi)
- Elevation: 123 m (404 ft)

Population (2011)
  - Total: 400,000
  - Density: 23,000/km^{2} (59,000/sq mi)

Languages
  - Official: Hindi, Urdu, English, Awadhi, Bhojpuri, Bengali
- Time zone: UTC+5:30 (IST)
- PIN: 226016
- Planning agency: U.P Avas Vikas Parishad(Housing & Development Board)
- Civic agency: Uttar Pradesh Avas Evam Vikas Parishad
- Rapid Transit access: Indira Nagar

Indira Nagar is a residential area in Lucknow in the Indian state of Uttar Pradesh. It is developed and maintained by the U.P. Housing and Development Board Also Known As (Awas Vikas Parishad). It's considered one of the largest colonies in "Asia" and also is one of the biggest and posh residential settlement planned in India.

== History ==
Indira Nagar (originally named Indira Nagar, but it was changed to Ram Sagar Mishra Nagar by CM Ram Naresh Yadav during the Janta Government) was a colony originally planned to have four blocks. It expanded to encompass 25 blocks. Surrounding villages merged with the colony during the expansion.

== Temples ==
Bhoothnath Temple in Indira Nagar is one of the oldest shrines in Lucknow, holding high religious importance. A statue of Lord Hanuman is installed in the main temple premises and on Tuesdays, you can see a long queue of devotees waiting patiently to offer their prayers. Besides, there are also idols of Goddess Parvati and Lord Shiva along with Nandi (the bull of Shiva) here. The entire nearby region has been developed with the same name along with the Bhoothnath Market, which has now become a significant market in Indira Nagar area of Lucknow.

Satya Mandir, B-116/2, Indira Nagar, Lucknow is a temple which is known globally around the world, where Lipi Roop Darshan of Almighty Lord is situated on both sides of Lord Krishna. Satya Mandir is the Head Office of Vani Publication, Vani Samiti, Humanity Foundation of India, Satyatirth Pashu Pakshi Sanrakshan Kendra Societies. 'Bhagwan ki Vani' is a collection of Divine Message which is published in the form of 400 books. Bhaktvatsal Srikrishna is a Magazine is being published from this place for last 16 years and being sent around the world.

Sai Mandir, B-335, Indira Nagar is a temple holding high religious importance in the region. A statue of Sai Baba is established in the main temple premises and on Thursdays, large groups of devotees are present for the processions.

Papa ji ka Sathsang is also situated in Indira Nagar, Papa Ji himself lived in Indira Nagar. Mooji has lived in Indira Nagar when he was under the discipleship of Papa Ji.

Indira Nagar is popular for hosting some of the prominent Durga Pujas in the city. These include Vivekananda Sewa Samiti, Munshipulia, Bondhu Mahal near Bhootnath Market, Manas Vihar Kalibari and Banga Bharati Samiti, Bhootnath Market. The latter most is the oldest in the entire neighbourhood which began in 1979.

== Blocks and markets ==
Bhootnath (B-Block) is the main market. Other markets are the group of Lekhraj Market Complexes, Amrapali Market, Sahara Shopping Centre, Meena Market (A-Block), Shivaji Market, Nagina Plaza, Hanuman Mandir Market (C-Block), and Munshi Pulia (D-Block). Bank branches, guest houses, banquet halls, hospitals, chemists, restaurants and construction material shops are there. Schools, government offices and utilities are there. It is one of the biggest and posh residential settlement planned in India.

== Hospitals & Clinics ==
Medical facilities are mainly provided by Private Services or doctors. Some of the major hospitals are:

- Shree Bhagwati homoeo centre, Sukh complex munshi puliya Indira nagar
- Shourya Polyclinic And Vaccination Centre
- Ujala Medical Center
- Shekhar Hospital
- State Institute of Health & Welfare
- Jankalyan Eye Hospital
- Sriram Hospital
- Shalimar Hospital
- CNS HOSPITAL
- Urovision Clinic
- The Velvet Skin Centre

== Parks ==
Parks include:

- Aurobindo Park
- Hari Om Park near Bhootnath
- Bandhu Park
- Sai Ram Park
- Major Ritesh Sharma Park
- Swarn Jayanti Park and Adarsh Park developed by Avas Vikas are the two most well-known.
- Maharana Pratap Park
- Smriti Vihar Park
- Saraswati Park
- Pragati Udyan

== Roads ==
The roads are laid out in a grid. Major roads running through and around Indiranagar are Ring Road, Church Road, Sitapur Road and Faizabad Road. The whole colony is served by auto-rickshaws and E-rickshaws. Transportation on major roads also have service of Local City Buses. Another common medium is manual rickshaws. Now metro is also used for transportation

== Metro ==
Munshi Pulia metro station is the metro station from where the metro train starts for Lucknow Charbagh railway station and Lucknow airport. There are 10 stops of metro between Munshi Pulia metro station and Charbagh Railway Station and there are 8 stops between Charbagh Railway Station and Chaudhary Charan Singh International Airport of Lucknow. Indira Nagar has metro stations namely

- Lekhraj Market metro station
- Bhootnath Market metro station
- Indira Nagar metro station
- Munshi Pulia metro station

== Schools ==
Most of the schools in Indira Nagar are operating within localities. Some of them are:

- Red Hill Kindergarten (A Block)
- Spring Dale College, A-Block
- St. Dominics, Indira Nagar near Bhootnath Market (B-Block)
- St.John's School (B-Block)
- City Montessori School, Indira Nagar (A-Block)
- Sherwood Academy, Indira Nagar (Sector 25)
- St Mary's, Indira Nagar (D-Block)
- Rani Laxmi Bai Memorial Senior Secondary School (C-block and Sector 14)
- Central Academy Lucknow (Sector 9)
- Delhi Public School Society, Indira Nagar (Sector 19)
- D.A.V. Public School, Indira Nagar (Sector 18)
- Eram Inter College (C-Block)
- New Way School (A-Block)
- Gurukul Academy (B-Block)
- United World School (Sector 15)
- ICCMRT, Lucknow (Sector 21)
- Holy Shrine Inter College
- Kiddy Kingdom Academy (A Block)
- Kidzee School (Sector 16)
- Manash Vihar, Picnic Spot Road
- Dabble College (Sector-15)
- Gurukul Academy, English Medium, Sector-B.
- Spring Dale College, ICSE Board, Sector-A.
- Canossa Convent, Sector-C
- Study Point (A-Block) Tubewell Colony
- st Mary's inter college (sector-14)
- Saraswati Balika Inter College (D-Block)
