= Singar Nagar metro station =

Lucknow Metro's Red Line metro station

Singar Nagar
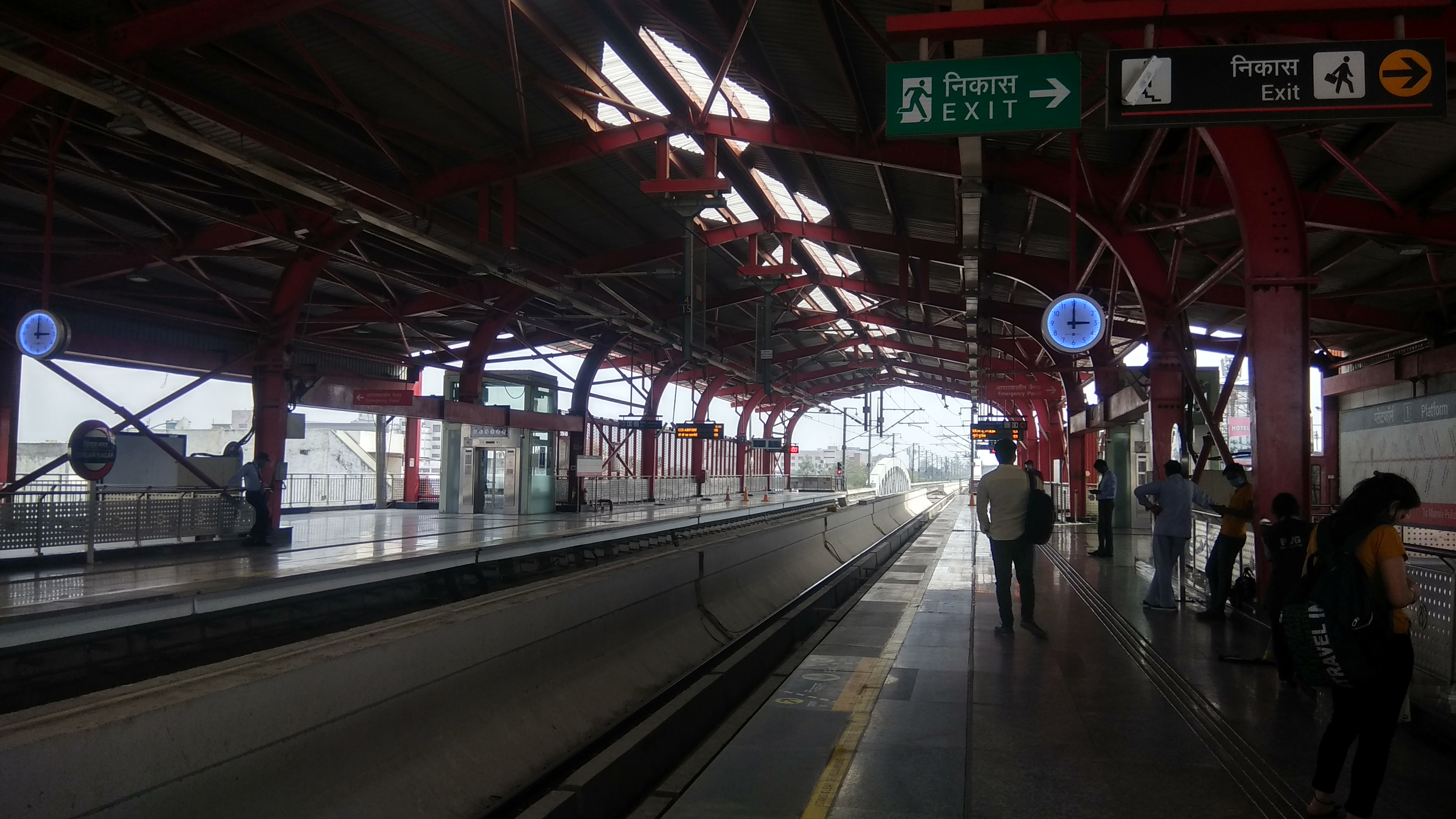

General information
- Location: Singar Nagar, Alambagh, Lucknow, Uttar Pradesh 226005
- Coordinates: 26.803044°N 80.896311°E
- System: Lucknow Metro station
- Owner: Lucknow Metro
- Operator: Uttar Pradesh Metro Rail Corporation
- Line: Red Line
- Platforms: Side platform Platform-1 → Munshi Pulia; Platform-2 → CCS International Airport
- Tracks: 2

Construction
- Structure type: Elevated, Double track
- Platform levels: 2
- Accessible: Yes

Other information
- Status: Staffed

History
- Opened: 6 September 2017; 8 years ago
- Electrified: Single-phase 25 kV 50 Hz AC through overhead catenary

Services
Preceding station	Lucknow Metro	Following station
Krishna Nagar towards CCS International Airport	Red Line	Alambagh towards Munshi Pulia
Route map
Location

Singar Nagar is an elevated metro station on the North-South Corridor of the Red Line of Lucknow Metro in the city of Lucknow, Uttar Pradesh, India.

== Station layout ==
G	Street level	Exit/Entrance
L1	Mezzanine	Fare control, station agent, Metro Card vending machines, crossover
L2	Side platform | Doors will open on the left
L2	Platform 2 Southbound	Towards → CCS International Airport; Next Station: Krishna Nagar
L2	Platform 1 Northbound	Towards ← Munshi Pulia; Next Station: Alambagh
L2	Side platform | Doors will open on the left
L2

== See also ==
- Lucknow
- List of Lucknow Metro stations
- Uttar Pradesh State Road Transport Corporation
- Rapid Transit in India
- List of metro systems
