= Amausi metro station =

Lucknow Metro's Red Line metro station

Amausi
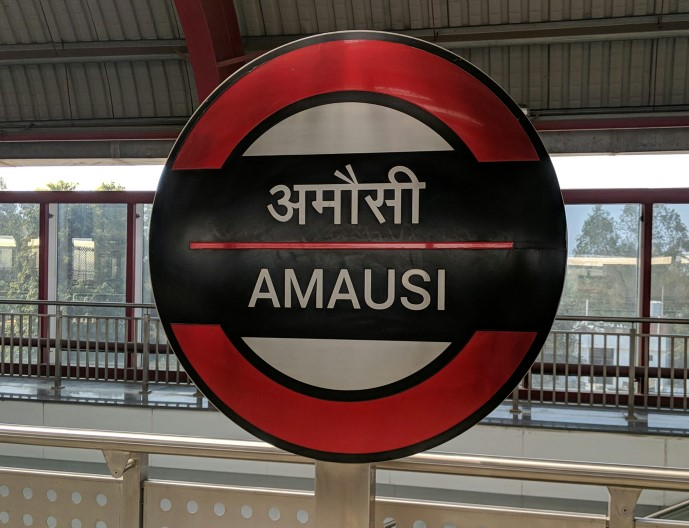

General information
- Location: Airport Road, Amausi, Lucknow
- Coordinates: 26.771246°N 80.878623°E
- System: Lucknow Metro station
- Owner: Lucknow Metro
- Operator: Uttar Pradesh Metro Rail Corporation
- Line: Red Line
- Platforms: Side platform Platform-1 → Munshi Pulia; Platform-2 → CCS International Airport
- Tracks: 2

Construction
- Structure type: Elevated, Double track
- Platform levels: 2

History
- Opened: 8 March 2019; 7 years ago
- Electrified: Single-phase 25 kV 50 Hz AC through overhead catenary

Services
Preceding station	Lucknow Metro	Following station
CCS International Airport Terminus	Red Line	Transport Nagar towards Munshi Pulia
Route map
Location

Amausi is a metro station on the North-South Corridor of the Red Line of Lucknow Metro serving the Amausi suburb of Lucknow, Uttar Pradesh, India. It was opened on 8 March 2019.

It is located at the Airport Road in Amausi.

== Station layout ==
G	Street level	Exit/Entrance
L1	Mezzanine	Fare control, station agent, Metro Card vending machines, crossover
L2	Side platform | Doors will open on the left
L2	Platform 2 Southbound	Towards → CCS International Airport
L2	Platform 1 Northbound	Towards ← Munshi Pulia; Next Station: Transport Nagar
L2	Side platform | Doors will open on the left
L2

== See also ==
- Lucknow
- List of Lucknow Metro stations
- Uttar Pradesh State Road Transport Corporation
- Rapid Transit in India
- List of metro systems
