= Hussainganj metro station =

Lucknow Metro's Red Line metro station

Hussainganj
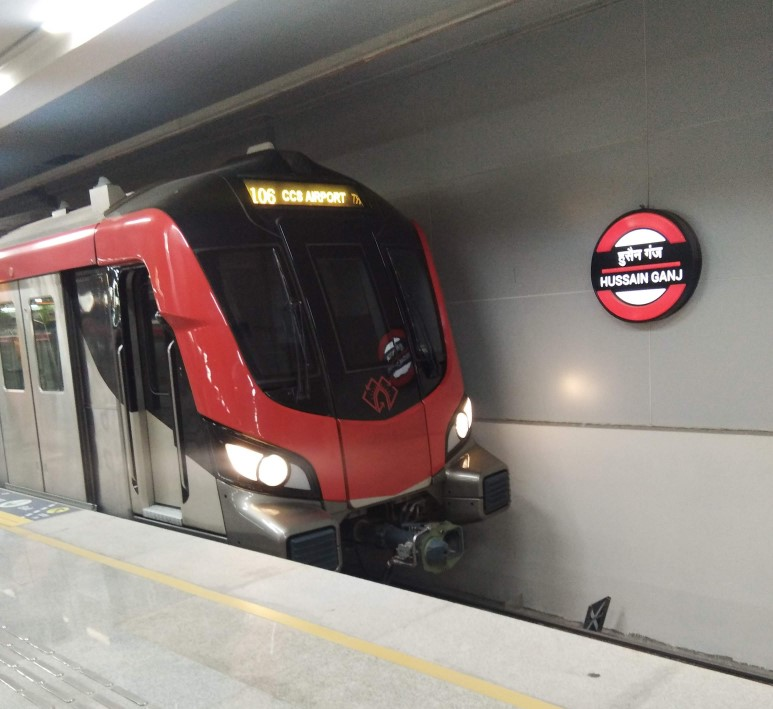
- This metro arriving at the station and heading towards CCS Int'l Airport

General information
- Location: Udaiganj, Husainganj, Lucknow, Uttar Pradesh 226001
- Coordinates: 26.839082°N 80.934498°E
- System: Lucknow Metro station
- Owner: Lucknow Metro
- Operator: Uttar Pradesh Metro Rail Corporation
- Line: Red Line
- Platforms: Island platform Platform 1 → Munshi Pulia; Platform 2 → CCS International Airport
- Tracks: 2

Construction
- Structure type: Underground, Double track
- Platform levels: 2

History
- Opened: 8 March 2019; 7 years ago
- Electrified: Single-phase 25 kV 50 Hz AC through overhead catenary

Services
Preceding station	Lucknow Metro	Following station
Charbagh towards CCS International Airport	Red Line	Sachivalaya towards Munshi Pulia
Route map
Location

Hussain Ganj is an underground metro station on the North-South Corridor of the Red Line of Lucknow Metro in Lucknow, Uttar Pradesh, India. It was opened to the public on 8 March 2019.

== Station layout ==
G	Street level	Exit/ Entrance
M	Mezzanine	Fare control, station agent, Ticket/token, shops
P	Platform 2 Southbound	Towards → CCS International Airport; Next Station: Charbagh
P	Island platform | Doors will open on the right
P	Platform 1 Northbound	Towards ← Munshi Pulia; Next Station: Sachivalaya

== See also ==
- Lucknow
- List of Lucknow Metro stations
- Uttar Pradesh State Road Transport Corporation
- Rapid Transit in India
- List of metro systems
