= Mahanagar metro station =

Cancelled metro station in Lucknow, India

Mahanagar was a cancelled metro station under Lucknow Metro. It was not included in the final line. It was proposed as the part of the Lucknow Metro's Red Line, which would have served the area of Mahanagar, but was dropped and removed from the final line. Currently, the area of Mahanagar is served by the nearby Badshahnagar and IT College metro stations.

== See also ==
- Lucknow Metro
- Red Line (Lucknow Metro)
- Lucknow
