= Vishwavidyalaya metro station (Lucknow) =

Lucknow Metro's Red Line metro station

Vishwavidyalaya
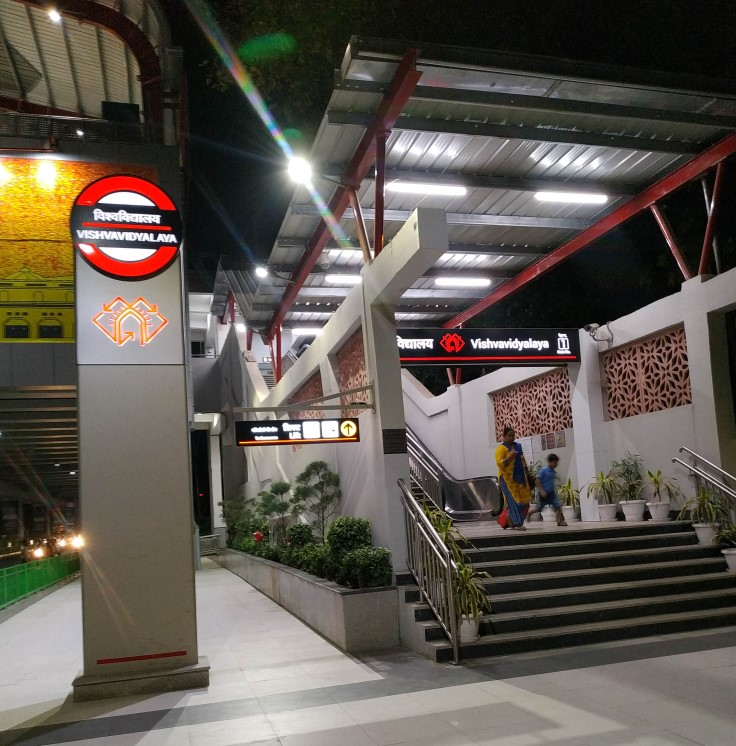
- Lucknow University metro station

General information
- Location: Babuganj, Hasanganj, Lucknow, Uttar Pradesh 226007
- Coordinates: 26.865501°N 80.939566°E
- System: Lucknow Metro station
- Owner: Lucknow Metro
- Operator: Uttar Pradesh Metro Rail Corporation
- Line: Red Line
- Platforms: Side platform Platform-1 → Munshi Pulia; Platform-2 → CCS International Airport
- Tracks: 2

Construction
- Structure type: Elevated, Double track
- Platform levels: 2

History
- Opened: 8 March 2019; 7 years ago
- Electrified: Single-phase 25 kV 50 Hz AC through overhead catenary

Services
Preceding station	Lucknow Metro	Following station
KD Singh Babu Stadium towards CCS International Airport	Red Line	IT Chauraha towards Munshi Pulia
Route map
Location

Vishwavidyalaya (Lucknow University) is an elevated metro station on the North-South Corridor of the Red Line of Lucknow Metro in Lucknow, Uttar Pradesh, India. It was opened to the public on 8 March 2019.

== Station layout ==
G	Street level	Exit/Entrance
L1	Mezzanine	Fare control, station agent, Metro Card vending machines, crossover
L2	Side platform | Doors will open on the left
L2	Platform 2 Southbound	Towards → CCS International Airport; Next Station: KD Singh Babu Stadium
L2	Platform 1 Northbound	Towards ← Munshi Pulia; Next Station: IT Chauraha
L2	Side platform | Doors will open on the left
L2

== See also ==
- Lucknow
- List of Lucknow Metro stations
- Uttar Pradesh State Road Transport Corporation
- Rapid Transit in India
- List of metro systems
