= List of Lucknow Metro stations =

Lucknow Metro route map

This is a list of all stations of the Lucknow Metro (Hindi: लखनऊ मेट्रो), a rapid transit system serving Lucknow India.

Lucknow Metro is the 9th metro system in India, after Kolkata Metro, Delhi Metro, Namma Metro, Rapid Metro Gurgaon, Mumbai Metro, Jaipur Metro, Chennai Metro and Kochi Metro.

The Lucknow metro covers a distance of 22.87 km with 21 stations, of which 17 are elevated and four underground.

It is built and operated by the Lucknow Metro Rail Corporation Limited (LMRC). Its first section was inaugurated on 5 September 2017 and opened for public on September 6, 2017, with the Red Line. As of now, Lucknow Metro has 21 metro stations, with a total route length of 22.878 km (14.216 mi).

== Metro stations ==
†	Terminal station
*	Transfer station
††	Transfer station to Indian Railways / ISBT

Station name		Line	Opened	Layout	Notes	Refs
English	Hindi	Line	Opened	Layout	Notes	Refs
Alambagh	आलमबाग़	Red Line	September 6, 2017	Elevated	–	
Alambagh ISBT††	आलमबाग आई एस बी टी	Red Line	September 6, 2017	Elevated	–	
Amausi	अमौसी	Red Line	March 8, 2019	Elevated	–	
Badshahnagar††	बादशाहनगर	Red Line	March 8, 2019	Elevated	Transfer for Badshahnagar railway station	
Bhootnath Market	भूतनाथ मार्केट	Red Line	March 8, 2019	Elevated	–	
Charbagh††	चारबाग़	Red Line	September 6, 2017	Elevated	Transfer for Lucknow Charbagh railway station	
CCS International Airport†	चौधरी चरण सिंह अंतरराष्ट्रीय हवाई अड्डा	Red Line	March 8, 2019	Underground	For Chaudhary Charan Singh International Airport	
Durgapuri††	दुर्गापुरी	Red Line	September 6, 2017	Elevated	Transfer for Lucknow Junction railway station	
Hazratganj	हज़रतगंज	Red Line	March 8, 2019	Underground	–	
Hussainganj	हुसैनगंज	Red Line	March 8, 2019	Underground	–	
Indira Nagar	इंदिरा नगर	Red Line	March 8, 2019	Elevated	–	
IT Chauraha	आईटी चौराहा	Red Line	March 8, 2019	Elevated	–	
KD Singh Babu Stadium	केडी सिंह बाबू स्टेडियम	Red Line	March 8, 2019	Elevated	–	
Krishna Nagar	कृष्णा नगर	Red Line	September 6, 2017	Elevated	–	
Lekhraj Market	लेखराज मार्केट	Red Line	March 8, 2019	Elevated	–	
Vishwavidyalaya	विश्वविद्यालय	Red Line	March 8, 2019	Elevated	–	
Mawaiya	मवईया	Red Line	September 6, 2017	Elevated	–	
Munshi Pulia†	मुंशीपुलिया	Red Line	March 8, 2019	Elevated	–	
Sachivalaya	सचिवालय	Red Line	March 8, 2019	Underground	–	
Singar Nagar	सिंगार नगर	Red Line	September 6, 2017	Elevated	–	
Transport Nagar	ट्रान्सपोर्ट नगर	Red Line	September 6, 2017	Elevated	–	

== Statistics ==
Total number of metro stations	21
Number of interchange stations	0
Number of elevated stations	17
Number of underground stations	4
Number of stations at-grade	0

== See also ==
- List of Ahmedabad Metro stations
- List of Chennai Metro stations
- List of Coimbatore Metro stations
- List of Delhi Metro stations
- List of Hyderabad Metro stations
- List of Jaipur Metro stations
- List of Kochi Metro stations
- List of Kolkata Metro stations
- List of Madurai Metro stations
- List of Mumbai Metro stations
- List of Noida Metro stations
- List of Nagpur Metro stations
- List of Namma Metro stations
- List of Navi Mumbai Metro Stations
- List of Pune Metro stations
- List of Surat Metro stations
