= Red Line (Lucknow Metro) =

Metro line in Lucknow, India

Red Line रेड लाइन

Overview
- Status: Operational
- Locale: Lucknow, Uttar Pradesh, India
- Termini: CCS International Airport; Munshi Pulia
- Stations: 21

Service
- Type: Rapid transit
- System: Lucknow Metro
- Operator: Uttar Pradesh Metro Rail Corporation
- Rolling stock: Alstom

History
- Opened: 5 September 2017; 9 years ago
- Last extension: 2019

Technical
- Line length: 22.878 km (14.22 mi)
- Character: Underground & Elevated
- Track gauge: 1,435 mm (4 ft 8 1/2 in) standard gauge
- Electrification: 25 kV 50 Hz AC overhead catenary
- Highest elevation: ~124 metres

The Red Line (Line 1) (Hindi: रेड लाइन) of the Lucknow Metro is a metro route of mass rapid transit system in Lucknow. It consists of 21 metro stations from CCS International Airport to Munshi Pulia with a total distance of 22.87 km. It is also known as the North-South corridor of Lucknow. The Lucknow metro train consists of four coaches, and they have a maximum speed of 90 km/h. Most of the lines are elevated.

== List of stations ==
Following is a list of stations on this route

Red Line
#	Station Name		Opening	Connections	Layout	Coordinates
#	English	Hindi	Opening	Connections	Layout	Coordinates
1	CCS International Airport	चौधरी चरण सिंह अंतरराष्ट्रीय हवाई अड्डा	8 March 2019	CCS International Airport	Underground	
2	Amausi	अमौसी	8 March 2019	None	Elevated	
3	Transport Nagar	ट्रांसपोर्ट नगर	5 September 2017	None	Elevated	26°46′41″N 80°52′58″E
4	Krishna Nagar	कृष्णा नगर	5 September 2017	None	Elevated	26°47′40″N 80°53′30″E
5	Singar Nagar	सिंगार नगर	5 September 2017	None	Elevated	26°48′11″N 80°53′46″E
6	Alambagh	आलमबाग़	5 September 2017	None	Elevated	26°48′50″N 80°54′08″E
7	Alambagh ISBT	आलमबाग बस स्टेशन	5 September 2017	Alambagh ISBT	Elevated	26°49′07″N 80°54′26″E
8	Mawaiya	मवईया	5 September 2017	None	Elevated	26°49′31″N 80°54′35″E
9	Durgapuri	दुर्गापुरी	5 September 2017	Lucknow Junction	Elevated	26°50′00″N 80°54′46″E
10	Charbagh	चारबाग़ रेलवे स्टेशन	5 September 2017	Blue Line; Lucknow Charbagh; Lucknow Junction; Charbagh Bus Station	Elevated	
11	Hussain Ganj	हुसैनगंज	8 March 2019	None	Underground	
12	Sachivalaya	सचिवालय	8 March 2019	None	Underground	
13	Hazratganj	हज़रतगंज	8 March 2019	None	Underground	
14	KD Singh Babu Stadium	केडी सिंह बाबू स्टेडियम	8 March 2019	None	Elevated	
15	Vishwavidyalaya	विश्वविद्यालय	8 March 2019	None	Elevated	
16	IT College	आईटी कॉलेज	8 March 2019	None	Elevated	
17	Badshahnagar	बादशाह नगर	8 March 2019	Badshahnagar	Elevated	
18	Lekhraj Market	लेखराज मार्केट	8 March 2019	None	Elevated	
19	Bhootnath Market	भूतनाथ मार्केट	8 March 2019	None	Elevated	
20	Indira Nagar	इंदिरा नगर	8 March 2019	None	Elevated	
21	Munshi Pulia	मुंशीपुलिया	8 March 2019	None	Elevated	

== See also ==
- Lucknow
- List of Lucknow Metro stations
- Blue Line (Lucknow Metro)
- Uttar Pradesh Metro Rail Corporation
- Uttar Pradesh State Road Transport Corporation
- List of rapid transit systems in India
- List of metro systems
