= Lucknow Metro =

Rapid transit system in Lucknow, Uttar Pradesh, India

- UPMRC Logo

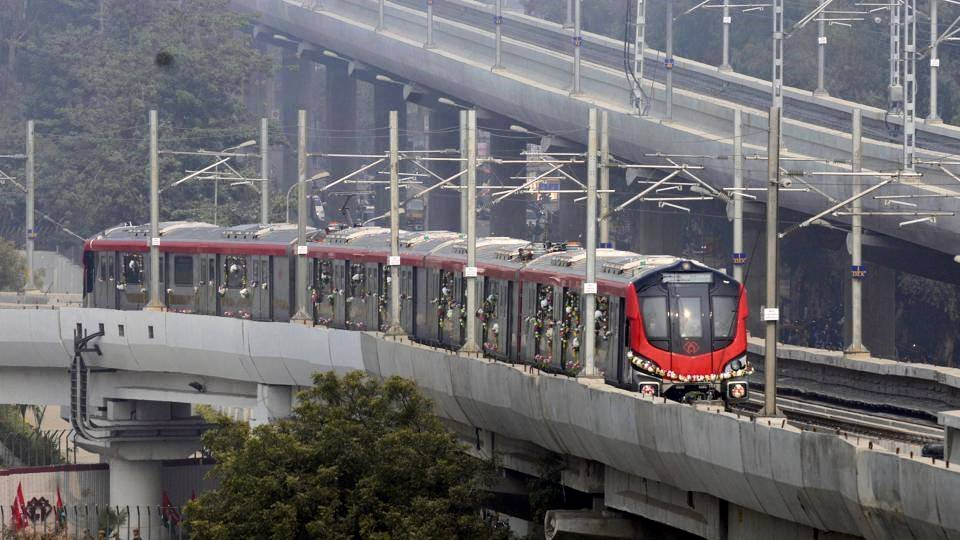

Overview
- Owner: Uttar Pradesh Metro Rail Corporation
- Locale: Lucknow, Uttar Pradesh, India
- Transit type: Rapid transit
- Number of lines: 1 (Operational); 1 (Under-construction)
- Line number: Red Line; Blue Line
- Number of stations: 21 (Operational); 12 (Under-construction)
- Daily ridership: 87000
- Headquarters: Vipin Khand, Gomti Nagar, Lucknow, Uttar Pradesh
- Website: Lucknow Metro

Operation
- Began operation: 5 September 2017; 9 years ago
- Operator: UPMRC
- Number of vehicles: 80
- Train length: 4 coaches
- Headway: 5 minutes

Technical
- System length: 22.87 km (14.21 mi) (Operational) 11.17 km (6.94 mi) (Approved)
- Track gauge: 1,435 mm (4 ft 8 1/2 in) standard gauge
- Electrification: 25 kV 50 Hz AC overhead catenary
- Average speed: 32–34 km/h (20–21 mph)
- Top speed: 90 km/h (56 mph)
System map

The Lucknow Metro is a mass rapid transit (MRT) system in Lucknow, Uttar Pradesh, India. The metro is owned and operated by the Uttar Pradesh Metro Rail Corporation (UPMRC). The frequency of the metro's services is around 5 - 7 minutes.

Along with Delhi Meerut RRTS, Meerut Metro, Noida Metro, Kanpur Metro and Agra Metro, it is one of the 5 operational metro networks in Uttar Pradesh. It is the 3rd largest urban transit system in the state after Delhi Meerut RRTS and Noida Metro.

Construction of the Phase 1A line began on 27 September 2014 with the 8.5 km (5.3 mi) stretch from Transport Nagar to Charbagh which began its commercial operation on 5 September 2017. Full operation on Red Line stretch from CCS International Airport to Munshi Pulia began operation on 9 March 2019. The Lucknow metro project is the most expensive transport system in Uttar Pradesh to date with an estimated total cost for Phase 1A (Red Line) and 1B (Blue Line) of about $2 billion, of which ₹6,928 crore (equivalent to ₹110 billion or US$1.2 billion in 2026) was spent on phase 1A.

The Government of Uttar Pradesh Approved the construction of the 11.165 km long East-West Corridor between Vasant Kunj to Charbagh, Phase 1B Blue Line at an estimated budget of ₹5,881 crore (equivalent to ₹63 billion or US$670 million in 2026) in January 2024.

Lucknow Metro achieved its highest ever ridership of 1.30 lakh passengers since its inception on 1 January 2024.

== History ==
The original design of the metro project included one north-south and one east-west corridor, with links through Gomti Nagar. Estimated costs for the north-south corridor were ₹5,413 crore (equivalent to ₹120 billion or US$1.3 billion in 2026), ₹3,611 crore (equivalent to ₹81 billion or US$870 million in 2026) for the east-west corridor and ₹495 crore (equivalent to ₹11 billion or US$120 million in 2026) for the link through Gomti Nagar. The initial layout of the east-west corridor started from Rajajipuram and ended at Hahnemann, after passing through Gomti Nagar via Hazratganj and Patrakarpuram, a distance of 14 kilometres (8.7 mi). However, in 2010 the design was changed so the corridor started from Vasant Kunj and terminated at Charbagh, a revised distance of 13 kilometres (8.1 mi).

The design of north–south corridor had two elevated sections, with a total distance of 19 km (12 mi), separated by a 3 km tunnel (1.9 mi). The length of the ramps between the elevated and below ground sections would total 0.8 km (0.50 mi). When completed, the corridor would run for a total distance of 23 kilometres (14 mi) and connect Amausi airport to Munshipulia. Passengers would be served by a total of 22 stations, with 19 elevated and 3 below ground. Elevated stations were to be located at CCS International Airport, Amausi, Transport Nagar, Krishna Nagar, Singar Nagar, Alambagh, Alambagh ISBT, Mawaiya, Durgapuri, Charbagh. Following Charbagh station, the line descends underground where Hussain Ganj, Sachivalaya (Uttar Pradesh Secretariat) and Hazratganj stations are located. The line then returns above ground for the remaining stations of the corridor, KD Singh Babu Stadium, Vishwavidyalaya ((Lucknow University)), IT College, Badshahnagar, Lekhraj Market, Bhootnath Market, Indira Nagar and the terminus at Munshi Pulia.

The metro could accommodate speeds up to 90 km/h (56 mph) but the typical usage would be at speeds of 34 km/h (21 mph) for the north–south corridor and 32 km/h (20 mph) for the east–west corridor. Originally, the metro trains were to be housed in one of two depots, a 20 hectares (49 acres) depot at Vasant Kunj and another at the airport, but due to security concerns the airport depot was removed from the plan.

In 2013, a report published by the Department of Housing and Urban Planning of the Government of Uttar Pradesh resulted in major changes to the metro project. The two corridor design was scrapped and replaced with one featuring a denser network of connectivity. This revision resulted in the layout of route being entirely elevated with no underground sections. The increased coverage of the metro would raise the cost of the project but reduced the operating cost per km. The reduction in operating cost is impacted by the difference in construction costs of the line itself, one km of overhead track costs ₹180 crore (US$19 million) as compared to ₹550 crore (US$59 million) for an underground track. The underground design also raised concerns about safety as well as increased energy consumption. The report also proposed the construction of an elevated Bus Rapid Transit System (BRTS) as a feeder service to the metro.

== Construction Phases ==
=== Phase 1 ===
Phase 1 of the Lucknow Metro project consists of two corridors: the North–South Corridor (Red Line), designated Phase 1A, and the East–West Corridor (Blue Line), designated Phase 1B. The two corridors are intended to improve public transport connectivity across Lucknow, including the city's residential, commercial and transportation centres.

==== Phase 1A ====
The detailed project report for the Lucknow Metro was approved in October 2013, and the Government of India granted in-principle approval for the North–South corridor in December 2013. The foundation stone was laid on 4 March 2014, and civil construction began on 27 September 2014. The 8.5-kilometre elevated section between Transport Nagar and Charbagh was developed as the priority section. Trial runs began in December 2016, and clearance from the Commissioner of Metro Railway Safety was obtained on 14 August 2017. The section was inaugurated on 5 September 2017, with passenger services beginning the following day.

Construction subsequently extended the corridor southwards to Chaudhary Charan Singh International Airport and northwards to Munshipulia. The completed 22.88-kilometre corridor was inaugurated on 8 March 2019, and services across the entire corridor opened to the public on 9 March 2019.

Phase 1A
Line Name	Terminals		Length	Stations	Opening Date
Red Line	CCS International Airport	Transport Nagar	2.67 km (1.66 mi)	2	8 March 2019
Red Line	Transport Nagar	Charbagh	8.5 km (5.3 mi)	8	5 September 2017
Red Line	Charbagh	Munshi Pulia	10.6 km (6.6 mi)	11	8 March 2019
Total			21.77 km (13.53 mi)	21	

==== Phase 1B ====
Phase 1B comprises the East–West corridor between Charbagh and Vasant Kunj. The Uttar Pradesh government approved the revised detailed project report in March 2024, followed by clearance from the Network Planning Group on 9 July 2024 and approval by the Public Investment Board in May 2025. On 12 August 2025, the Union Cabinet approved the 11.165-kilometre corridor at an estimated cost of ₹5,801 crore, with seven underground stations and five elevated stations.

Procurement for the corridor progressed during 2025 and 2026. Bids for detailed design consultancy were invited in August 2025, and the selection of an AYESA joint venture was reported in February 2026. The consultancy covers civil, architectural, electrical, mechanical and traction designs, including the depot at Vasant Kunj. In July 2026, the Uttar Pradesh Metro Rail Corporation invited bids for the underground section between Charbagh and Chowk, including seven stations and associated tunnels. The tender specified a construction period of 36 months from the commencement of work. In October 2026, Afcons Infrastructure emerged as the lowest bidder for the approximately 6.70-kilometre underground construction package, with a bid of ₹1,383.30 crore.

Phase 1B
Line Name	Terminals		Length	Stations	Status	Opening Date
Blue Line	Charbagh	Vasant Kunj	11.17 km (6.94 mi)	12	Approved	2029
Total			32.94 km (20.47 mi)	33		

Phase 1
Line Name	Terminals		Length	Stations	Status	Opening Date
Red Line	CCS International Airport	Transport Nagar	2.67 km (1.66 mi)	2	Completed	8 March 2019
Red Line	Transport Nagar	Charbagh	8.5 km (5.3 mi)	8	Completed	5 September 2017
Red Line	Charbagh	Munshi Pulia	10.6 km (6.6 mi)	11	Completed	8 March 2019
Blue Line	Charbagh	Vasant Kunj	11.17 km (6.94 mi)	12	Approved	2029
Total			32.94 km (20.47 mi)	33		

== Lines ==
=== Red Line ===
The Red Line, also known as the North–South Corridor, runs for 22.878 kilometres (14.216 mi) between CCS International Airport and Munshipulia. It serves 21 stations, comprising 17 elevated and four underground stations. The initial section between Transport Nagar and Charbagh opened to passengers on 6 September 2017. The complete corridor opened to the public on 9 March 2019.

=== Blue Line ===
The Blue Line, also known as the East–West Corridor, is planned to connect Charbagh with Vasant Kunj over a length of 11.165 kilometres (6.938 mi). The corridor will comprise 12 stations, including seven underground and five elevated stations, serving areas of Old Lucknow such as Aminabad, Pandeyganj and Chowk. The Union Cabinet approved Phase 1B on 12 August 2025 at an estimated cost of ₹5,801 crore.

== Network ==
Lucknow Metro
No.	Line Name	Terminal		Stations	Length	First Operation	Last Extension
1	Red Line	CCS Airport	Munshi Pulia	21	22.87 km (14.21 mi)	5 September 2017	8 March 2019
Total				21	22.87 km (14.21 mi)		

== Project timeline ==
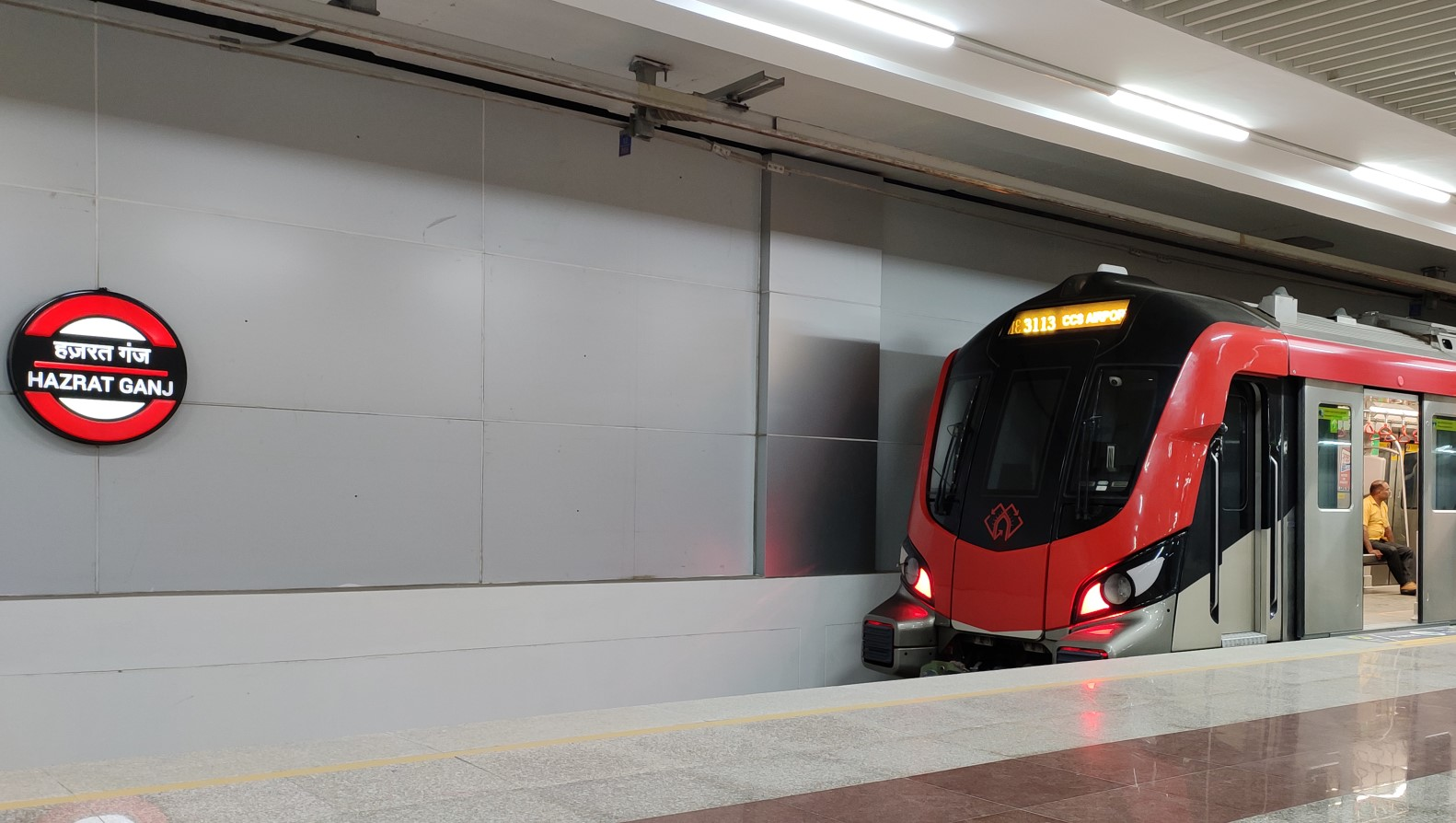
Hazrat Ganj Metro Station, Lucknow

- September 2008: DMRC submits a concept paper after the Lucknow metro rail project is proposed by the Government of Uttar Pradesh headed by chief minister Mayawati.
- February 2009: An agreement is signed between DMRC and LDA.
- June 2013: The state cabinet headed by chief minister Akhilesh Yadav gives clearance for the metro rail network. The state cabinet also gave approval for the creation of Lucknow Metro Rail Corporation.
- August 2013: Government of Uttar Pradesh approves the revised Detailed Project Report (DPR) submitted by DMRC.
- October 2013: LMRC, a special purpose vehicle (SPV) is formed by the Government of Uttar Pradesh to build and operate the Lucknow Metro. The SPV is incorporated under the Companies Act, 1956 on 25 November 2013. Construction Phase to begin in December.
- November 2013: DMRC submits tender for Lucknow Metro work, promises to complete the first phase by Feb 2017.
- December 2013: Government of India, in principle, approves the project.
- March 2014: Foundation stone laid for Lucknow Metro project.
- 10 July 2014: ₹100 crore (equivalent to ₹174 crore or US$19 million in 2026) set aside for Lucknow Metro in the union budget, by Minister of Finance, Arun Jaitley.

=== Red Line ===
- 27 September 2014: Construction begins on the Lucknow Metro.
- 6 August 2015: Lucknow Metro receives clearance from Public Investment Board (PIB) of Government of India.
- 22 December 2015: Union Cabinet approves construction of Rail Project Phase - 1A.
- 30 March 2016: To speed up clearance processes for Lucknow Metro, LMRC becomes a 50:50 joint venture between the Government of India and the Government of Uttar Pradesh. As a result, the LMRC board is reconstituted with five nominee directors being nominated by both Government of India and Government of Uttar Pradesh each, apart from the three full-time directors. Additionally, the Chief Secretary of Uttar Pradesh is replaced by the Union Urban Development Secretary as the ex-officio chairman of LMRC.
- 18 September 2016: 90% of the work completed in the construction of Rail Project Phase - 1A.
- 20 October 2016: Lucknow metro begins work on Faizabad Road, does Bhoomi puja for Phase 1A Extension.
- 1 December 2016: The Uttar Pradesh chief minister Akhilesh Yadav and Samajwadi Party chief Mulayam Singh flagged off the train at the Transport Nagar depot on a trial run on priority section till the Alambagh. The inaugural ride was piloted by two women.
- 20 June 2017: Fifth metro train set arrives at Transport Nagar depot.
- 8 July 2017: Sixth and final metro train set arrives for first phase requirement.
- 27–28 July 2017: The Commissioner of Railway Safety (CMRS) performs on-site inspection to confirm readiness of the Metro for service.
- 29 August 2017: Inauguration ceremony, on 5 September 2017, confirmed. Announcement that metro trains will run between Transport Nagar and Charbagh.
- 5 September 2017: Minister of Home Affairs and member of parliament for Lucknow, Rajnath Singh and chief minister, Yogi Adityanath inaugurate Lucknow metro for service between Transport Nagar and Lucknow Charbagh.
- 23 February 2019: Work on whole of North-South Corridor (Red Line) completed, CMRS approves for commercial run. Full line to be inaugurated on 8 March 2019.
- 8 March 2019: Prime Minister Narendra Modi inaugurates full stretch of Red Line of Lucknow Metro.
- January 2024: The Government of Uttar Pradesh has planned extension of the Red Line from CCS Airport to SGPGI, Lucknow on one end and from Munshipuliya to Indian Institute of Management, Lucknow on the other end.

=== Blue Line ===
- August 2019: Modified DPR is yet to be approved by state government and also LMRC is yet to get land for a second metro depot which is to come up near upcoming Vasant Kunj.
- January 2024: The Government of Uttar Pradesh Approved the construction of 11.165 km long East-West Corridor between Vasant Kunj to Charbagh, Blue Line which is also known as Phase 1B, at an estimated budget of ₹5,881 crore (US$630 million) in January 2024 with an expected completion timeline of 2029.
- August 2025: Union Cabinet approves Phase 1B of Lucknow Metro for ₹5,801 crore.
- As of August 2026, construction work and soil testing process has commenced on Lalji Tandon Marg in Sarfarazganj area.

== Funding ==
Over 50% of the Lucknow Metro rail project is funded through external debt from European Investment Bank. The Lucknow Metro has its own operating body, the Lucknow Metro Rail Corporation, is a Special Purpose Vehicle (SPV) and a 50:50 Joint Venture set-up by the Government of India and Government of Uttar Pradesh. LMRC is headquartered in Vipin Khand, Gomti Nagar, Lucknow.

== Infrastructure ==
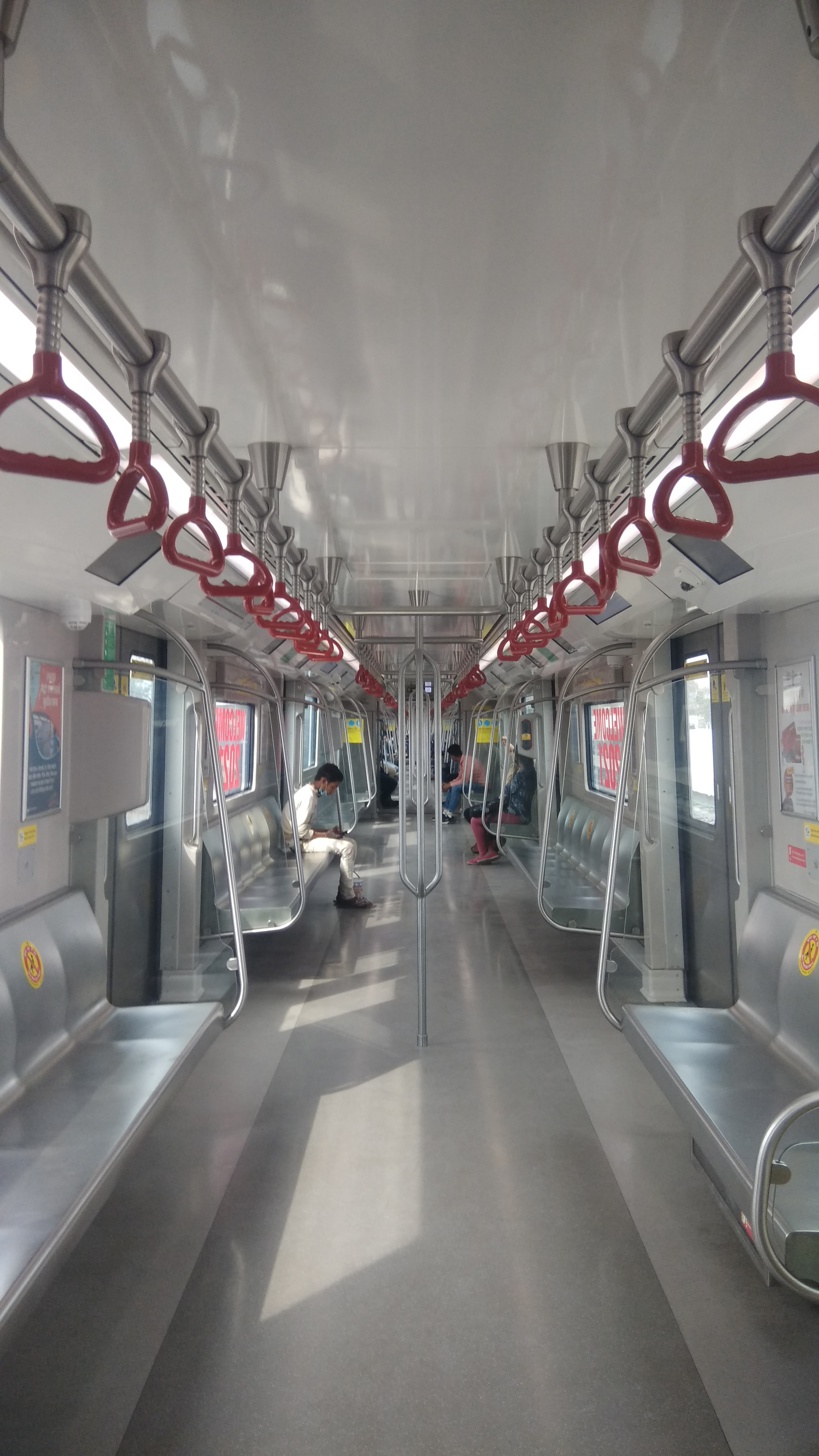
Inside view of a coach of Lucknow Metro Manufactured by Alstom

=== Rolling stock ===
On 5 October 2015, Alstom was awarded a ₹1,102 crore (equivalent to ₹18 billion, US$190 million or €170 million in 2026) contract to construct twenty four car EMU for Phase 1A, based on their Metropolis design. The vehicles are to be constructed at Alstom's factory in Sricity, Andhra Pradesh.

=== Station facilities ===
WiFi is available at each station with free access for smart card holders. Other services include free purified drinking water and free toilets.

The north–south corridor of the Lucknow Metro uses an automated fare collection (AFC) system, provided by Datamatics Business Solutions.

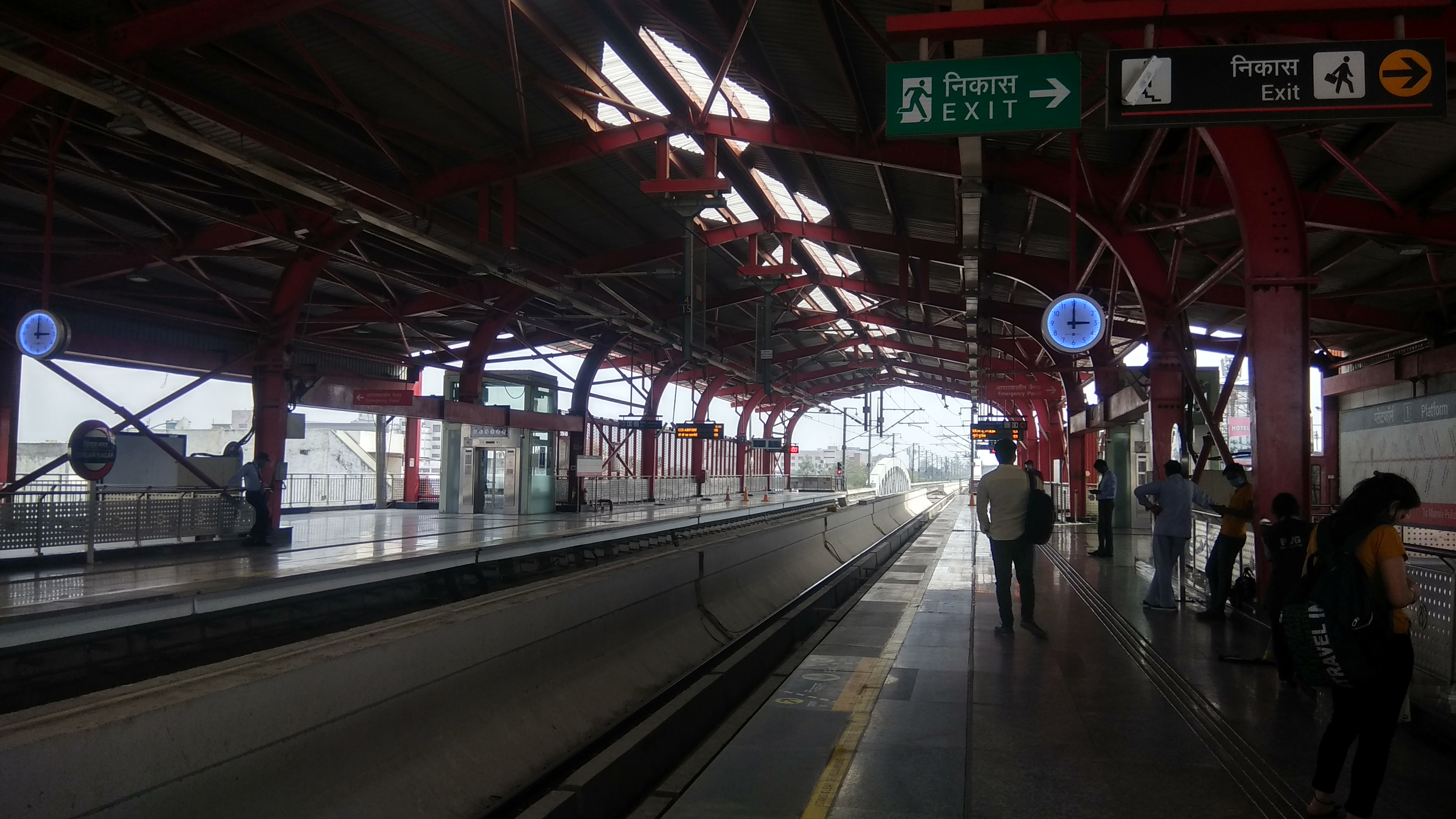
Typical view of platform of Lucknow Metro (In picture Singar Nagar station)

== Security ==
Lucknow Metro's security is based on a hybrid model. The Lucknow City Police, which has raised a dedicated squad of 393 personnel for this purpose from the Uttar Pradesh Provincial Armed Constabulary (PAC), provides general security, which includes frisking, scanning, maintaining and having quick response teams (QRT) as per security norms, while a private security agency provides operational security, which including maintaining hygiene of the station and ensuring that people queue properly.

Personnel from the PAC were especially trained for providing security by the Central Industrial Security Force (CISF) in New Delhi.

Apart from this, CCTV and metal detectors are installed at every metro station.

=== Ticketing and recharge ===
Smart Cards and Tokens are available from Ticket Counters for travelling.

==== Ridership ====
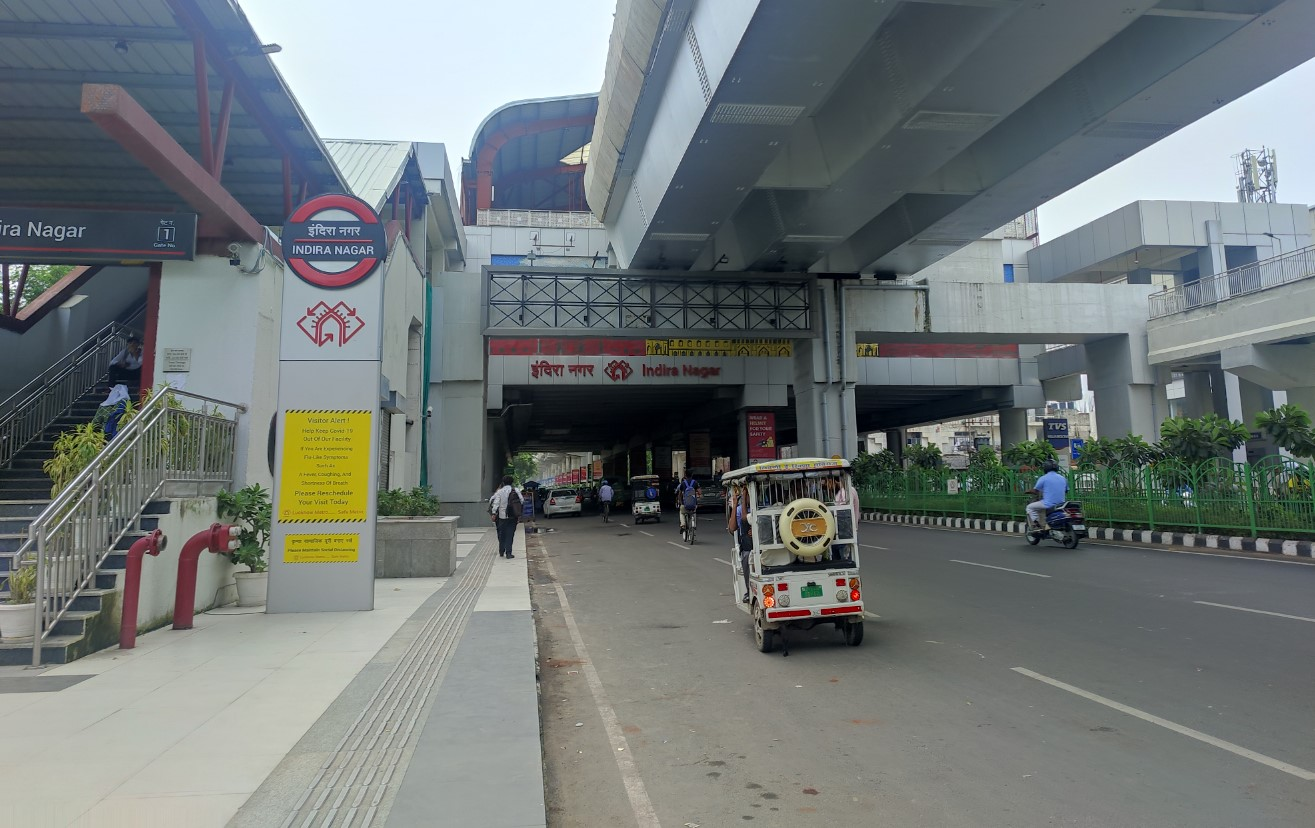
Indira Nagar metro station, Lucknow

The cumulative ridership of the metro rail in Lucknow crossed 1 million in the first 70 days of commercial operation; the rapid-transit system received 31,688 passengers on its inaugural day of services, and recorded a ridership of 41,075 on 10 September.

As of June 2018, the daily ridership of Lucknow Metro ranges between 10,000 and 11,000; with monthly ridership being 480,000 in September 2017, 400,000 in October 2017, 300,000 in November and December 2017, and around 300,000 in January, February, March and April 2018. As of 2019, as many as 60,000 people are using metro service on a daily basis in Lucknow.

Lucknow Metro achieved its highest ever ridership of 1.30 lakh passengers since its inception in 2017 on 1 January 2024 which surpassed the previous record of 93,237 passengers set on 25 December 2023.

== In popular culture ==
In January 2017, Hindi film Behen Hogi Teri became the first film to shoot scenes on the metro premises.

== Awards ==
- Lucknow Metro was awarded 2nd Place for 'Best Metro for Excellence in Innovative Designs' at 5th Annual Metro Rail Summit in New Delhi behind the Delhi Metro. It competed against the other metro projects of the country like Mumbai Metro, Jaipur Metro etc.
- Lucknow Metro Rail Corporation (LMRC) was awarded the European Society for Quality Research (ESQR) Choice Prize Award 2016 under the Gold category, a vanity award.
- Lucknow Metro Rail Corporation won the Dun & Bradstreet Infra Award in 2017 in the Metro Rail category for completing "Priority Corridor" of the North –South Corridor (Phase 1A) and commissioning the project in a record time of less than three years. .
- Lucknow Metro Rail Corporation won the International 'Royal Society for the Prevention of Accidents' (RoSPA) Award. LMRC was given the Silver Award for its Phase 1A (North-South Corridor) in the Project/Infrastructure category for the year 2018.
- Lucknow Metro Rail Corporation was certified with the highest green rating (i.e. the Platinum Rating) by the Indian Green Building Council (IGBC).
- Lucknow Metro Rail Corporation has International Organization for Standardization (ISO) 14001: 2004 & Occupational Health & Safety Assessment Series (OHSAS) 18001: 2007 certificates in recognition of the organisation's integrated management system in compliance with ISO & OHSAS standards and requirements.
- Lucknow Metro Rail Corporation was awarded the "Best Urban Mass Transit" project during the 10th Urban Mobility India Conference & Exhibition and CODATU XVII Conference under Ministry of Housing and Urban Affairs at Hyderabad, Telangana in November 2017.
- Lucknow Metro Rail Corporation's managing director, Kumar Keshav, was awarded with the 'Shaan-E-Lucknow' award by the organisers of the Lucknow Book Fair and a special postal envelope cover bearing the logo, symbol and mnemonic of Lucknow Metro was released.
- Lucknow Metro Rail Corporation won the first Dr APJ Abdul Kalam Memorial Award on Innovation in governance on 15 October 2016.

== See also ==
- Urban rail transit in India
  - Uttar Pradesh Metro Rail Corporation
    - Kanpur Metro
    - Agra Metro
  - Delhi–Meerut Regional Rapid Transit System
    - Meerut Metro
  - List of Lucknow Metro stations
  - Timeline of Lucknow Metro
- Uttar Pradesh State Road Transport Corporation
- List of Metro Systems
