= Chaudhary Charan Singh International Airport =

Airport serving Lucknow, Uttar Pradesh, India

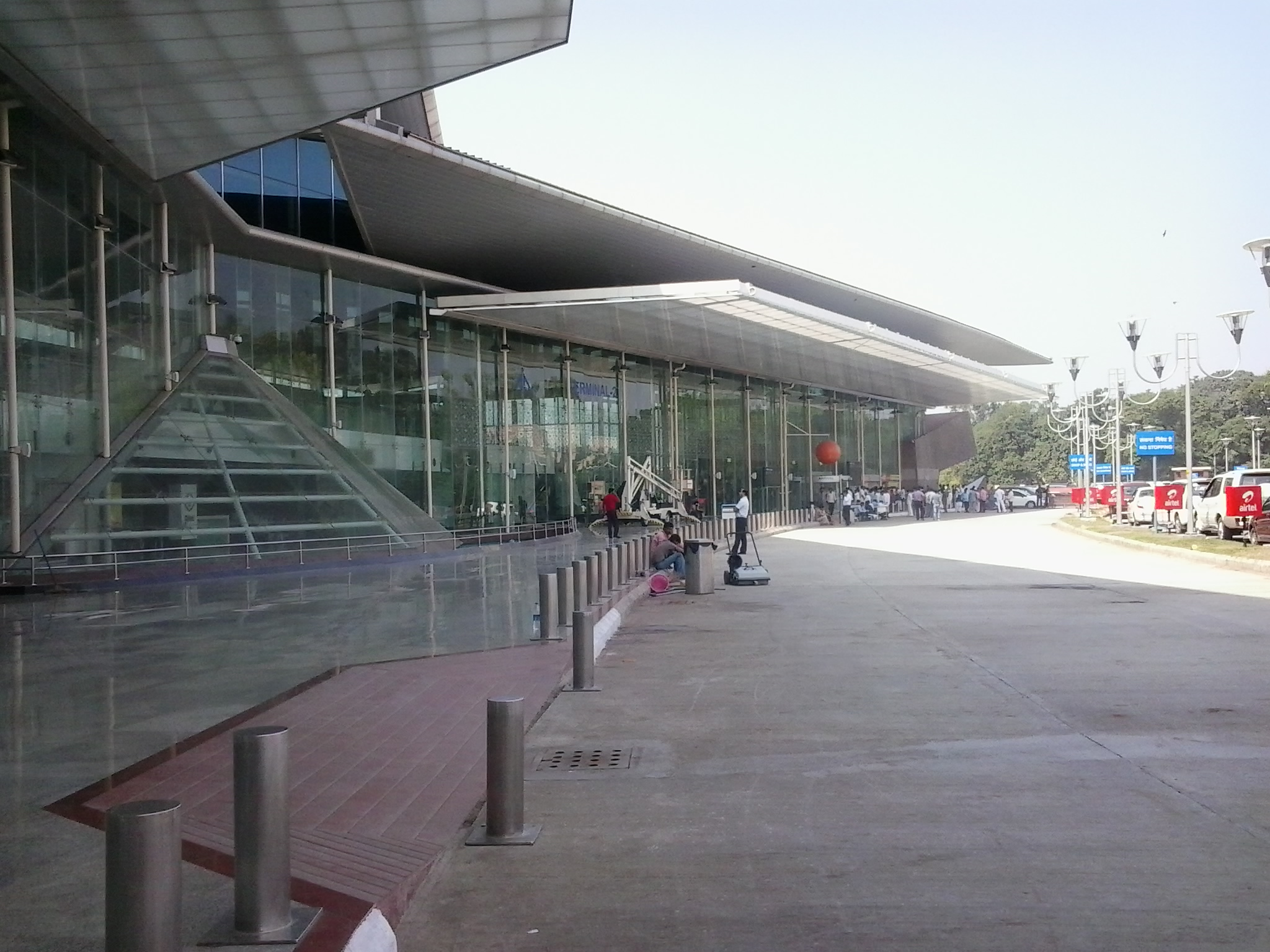
- IATA: LKO; ICAO: VILK; WMO: 42369

Summary
- Airport type: Public
- Owner: Airport Authority of India
- Operator: Lucknow International Airport Limited
- Serves: Lucknow Metropolitan Region
- Location: Amausi, Lucknow, Uttar Pradesh, India
- Opened: 1986; 40 years ago
- Focus city for: IndiGo
- Elevation AMSL: 406 ft (124 m)
- Coordinates: 26°45′38″N 080°53′25″E
- Public transit access: Red Line CCSI Airport
- Website: CCSIA Lucknow

Map
- Location in Amausi, Lucknow, Uttar Pradesh LKO/VILK (India)

Runways
Direction	Length		Surface
Direction	m	ft	Surface
09/27	2,744	9,003	PEM

Statistics (April 2025 – March 2026)
- Passengers: 6,065,957 (▼5.8%)
- Aircraft movements: 40,276 (▼18.9%)
- Cargo tonnage: 22,566 (▲2.1%)
- Source: AAI

Chaudhary Charan Singh International Airport (abbr. CCSIA) (IATA: LKO, ICAO: VILK) is an international airport serving Lucknow, the capital of the Indian state of Uttar Pradesh. It is located in Amausi, 14 km (8.7 mi) from the city centre, and was earlier known as ''Amausi Airport''. It is named after Chaudhary Charan Singh, the fifth Prime Minister of India. It is owned and operated by the Lucknow International Airport Limited (LIAL), a public–private consortium led by Adani Group.

The airport is the 12th-busiest airport in terms of passenger traffic in India. It handled over 6.4 million passengers, with more than 49,660 aircraft movements in the fiscal year 2024–25, The CCSIA metro station, southernmost station of the Red Line, lies in front of Terminal-2. Due to the COVID-19 pandemic, passenger traffic declined by 55.1% in the FY 2020-2021 and aircraft movements by 40.4% in the same year. The airport currently has one Integrated Terminal operational namely Terminal 3, which was inaugurated and opened by Prime Minister Narendra Modi on 10 March 2024.

== History ==
The airport was constructed in 1986 to facilitate service to corporate and government officials. With an increasing number of passengers, demand, traffic and airlines, the Airports Authority of India (AAI) decided to upgrade and expand the airport in 1996. On 17 July 2008, the Government of India officially renamed the airport to Chaudhary Charan Singh International Airport, after Chaudhary Charan Singh, the fifth Prime Minister of India.

The second terminal, Terminal 2, was then built in 2012 to handle the increasing domestic traffic. It was inaugurated by the then Minister of Civil Aviation, Ajit Singh, and granted international status on 19 May 2012. It covers an area of 17,000 m^{2} (180,000 sq ft) with two aerobridges, and is equipped with all basic and modern facilities and amenities. The announcement of a new passenger terminal, Terminal 3, at the airport was made in 2016 by the then Minister of Civil Aviation, Suresh Prabhu, owing to the growing traffic and demands for more international flights and destinations. In 2018, the Government of India approved the new Terminal 3, to be built in two phases at a cost of about ₹2,400 crore (US$260 million). The terminal's first phase began construction in February 2018, and was expected to be completed by December 2021. However, due to the COVID-19 pandemic, which caused shortage of labour and slowdowns in work, it got delayed, and was expected to be completed by December 2023. It was completed and inaugurated by Prime Minister Narendra Modi on 10 March 2024. It covers an area of 111,367 m^{2} (1,198,740 sq ft), has seven aerobridges and three floors, including the first floor for departures, the second floor for arrivals and a large basement of 20,461 m^{2} (220,240 sq ft). An elevated four-lane approach road corridor links Terminals 2 and 3 with the city through National Highway 27 (NH-27), which connects Lucknow with Kanpur, of 6,646 m^{2} (71,540 sq ft) covering about 1.8 km (1.1 mi). The terminal is be capable of serving over 13 million passengers annually. It is designed to match the local culture and heritage, and has been built on the lines of Frankfurt Airport, Germany to match its modern, developed and advanced technological amenities and features. The second phase of the terminal will be extended eastwards by demolishing the existing Terminal 1 between Terminals 2 and 3.

In February 2019, the Adani Enterprises led–Lucknow International Airport Limited (LIAL) won the rights of operations, management and development of the airport under the public-private partnership (PPP) model. As per the agreement, the airports would be handed to the company for a period of 50 years at the highest bid of ₹ 171 per passenger. The company will pay the per-passenger fee (PPF) to the AAI for every domestic and international passenger handled at the airport.

== Runway ==
The airport has one runway oriented 09/27, with a length of 2,744 m (9,003 ft) and a width of 45 m (148 ft). It has an ILS CAT IIIB capability on the eastern threshold, which enables landing in low visibility and abnormal weather conditions. Along with the airport, Delhi, Bangalore, Kolkata, Jaipur, and Amritsar are the only 6 airports in India with ILS CAT IIIB which helps flights land safely, even with visibility as low as 50 metres. As of March 2024, the runway is being revamped to handle more flights and bigger aircraft like the Airbus A350 and Boeing 787. It will have new ground lights for aircraft operations, introduction of three new link taxiways and extension of the runway end safety area (RESA).

== Terminals ==
=== Terminal 1 ===
The original terminal, built in 1986 to cater government and private officials and flights, has been designed to complement the architecture of Lucknow Charbagh railway station. It has two arrival and three departing gates as well as two immigration counters. The terminal was expanded in 1996. It is currently used for only international flights after the opening of Terminal 2 in 2012. It has only basic facilities available to cater to the needs of passengers. It will be demolished in the second phase of the airport expansion project to link Terminals 2 and 3.

=== Terminal 2 ===
Terminal 2 had been built to become the international terminal and serve the growing traffic and demands. However, considering the large domestic travel demand, it was later decided to be used only for domestic flights. Renowned for its design, the terminal's elevation to the sky resembles the folded wings of a paper plane. Large wing-like cantilevers on either side of the 200 m (660 ft)-long roof depict vibrancy and swiftness. The building itself appears as a dynamic object preparing to take flight. Inside, the gently curving ceiling gives the feeling of being under the belly of a giant aircraft. The design of the building does not labour to represent the culture and heritage of the city, instead gets imprinted with the architects' own experiences of nightmares about an aircraft crashing down through the roof, the exhilaration of flight, lightness, the indented front of the city as it wraps around the Gomti River and the ruins of the British Residency after the mutiny of 1857. Frosted etchings on the glass façade of the building bear the intricate patterns of Chikankari, the famous embroidery work of Lucknow. The terminal was inaugurated by then Minister of Civil Aviation, Ajit Singh, on 19 May 2012, before opening on 2 June 2012.

Covering an area of 17,000 m^{2} (180,000 sq ft), the terminal can handle 1,200 passengers per hour and around 4 million passengers per year. The terminal was being used more than its capacity which led the Lucknow International Airport Limited (LIAL), the owner of the airport headed by Adani Group, increasing the passenger handling capacity per hour by 200 passengers. The terminal was refurbished by the Adani Group in 2022 after their takeover in 2020, as per its plan to refurbish terminals of airports taken over from the Airports Authority of India (AAI). After the commissioning of Terminal 3, the pressure on Terminal 2 has been significantly relieved. It is also likely that the Terminal 2 will be converted into an administrative building for airport operations.

=== Terminal 3 ===
In 2018, Suresh Prabhu, the then Minister of Civil Aviation, announced that a new third passenger terminal building will be constructed with an area of 111,362 m^{2} (1,198,690 sq ft), including a basement area of 20,461 m^{2} (220,240 sq ft) and a connecting corridor between Terminals 2 and 3, which will cover an area of 6,646 m^{2} (71,540 sq ft). To be built in two phases, the first phase will be able to serve more than 13 million passengers annually. It has been built at a cost of ₹1,383 crore (US$150 million), which is now estimated at ₹2,400 crore (US$260 million). The Peak-Hour Handling (PHP) capacity of the new terminal is 4,000 passengers, of which 3,200 is domestic and 800 international. There are a total of 75 check-in counters, of which 60 are for domestic and 15 for international passengers, and 18 check-in kiosks for passengers travelling through the terminal. It is equipped with six aerobridges, which will be increased to eight after the completion of the second phase, through which the passengers can board directly to the flight from their respective boarding gates. It has 30 lifts and 5 escalators. In January 2018, the construction of the terminal building was started by Nagarjuna Construction Company (NCC). All design and interiors have been designed based on the Frankfurt Airport in Frankfurt, Germany, by the British architectural firm, Pascall+Watson. The second phase, which includes the extension of part of Terminal 3 after demolition of Terminal 1 and constructing a connecting corridor between Terminals 2 and 3 will be completed in the next five years. On 25 February 2019, the Adani Group was awarded with the operations and expansion of the existing as well as the new Terminal 3. It is a multi-storeyed terminal building with departures at the first floor and arrivals at the ground floor. The terminal's architecture will endeavour to express the position of Lucknow as a key city and will display the traditional culture and heritage of Uttar Pradesh. The building is also provided with interior decorations to match the modern structure and enhance passenger experience. Along with the terminal, a multi-storey parking facility is also under construction, which will have a parking of 1,500 vehicles. Also, over 5 km (3.1 mi) of storm water drains have been constructed parallel to the runway on either side to facilitate the outflow of the water into the Bijnor Canal. Terminal 3 was inaugurated and opened by Prime Minister Narendra Modi on 10 March 2024.

As of September 2025, FTI-TTP has commenced at Chaudhary Charan Singh (Lucknow) International Airport.

=== Cargo terminal ===
It was opened in March 2022. The facility has increased the cargo handling capacity of the airport by 40 per cent to 7000 tonnes per year. The airport has also increased to over 1000 tones per month by the end of FY 2022–2023. At present, e-commerce, courier, post office mails, general cargo, valuables, mobile phones, and perishables are exported as well as imported at the airport. The airport is also in talks with various multi-national companies to use the airport as a regional distribution hub. A new integrated cargo terminal with a capacity of 30,000 tonnes is planned at the airport by the administration.

== Airlines and destinations ==
Airlines	Destinations
Air India Express	Abu Dhabi, Delhi, Jeddah, Pune, Ras Al Khaimah, Riyadh
Akasa Air	Bengaluru, Mumbai, Navi Mumbai
Air Asia	Kuala Lumpur–International
Flydubai	Dubai–International
Flyadeal	Dammam, Jeddah, Medina,
IndiGo	Abu Dhabi, Bhopal, Dehradun, Dubai–International, Navi Mumbai, Noida, Patna
SalamAir	Muscat
Saudia	Jeddah
Star Air	Hyderabad, Jharsuguda, Kishangarh
Thai AirAsia	Bangkok–Don Mueang

== Future ==
=== Airport expansion ===
- The runway expansion from 2744 m to 3500 m.
- The Adani Group will invest Rs 10,700 crore into Lucknow Airport's expansion so that its annual passenger handling capacity zooms from 4 million passengers per annum (MPPA) to 39 MPPA.
- The airport's expansion plan received clearance from the Union Environment Ministry on 15 December. However, the plan submitted to the ministry did not mention the deadline for the expansion.
- The plan of Lucknow International Airport Limited (LIAL), an Adani group company, said: "CCSIA (Chaudhary Charan Singh International Airport) in Lucknow has a total land area of 509.41 hectares (1258.80 acres), making it one of the most land-constrained airports in India." LIAL now proposes expansion of CCSIA within an area of 457.1 hectares, it added.
- Along with Terminal 3, a new terminal building (Terminal 4), 3 parallel taxiways along the runway with associated infrastructure, support facilities, and utilities will be built to accommodate 39 MPPA, the plan noted.
- Total built up area for Terminal 4 along with Terminal 3 modification would be 4,26,131 square meter whereas the total footprint area of Terminal 4 and Terminal 3 modification would be 1,39,020 square meters
- LIAL's plan said a cargo complex would be developed at CCSIA in a total area of 23.14 hectares to handle cargo up to 0.25 million tonnes per annum.
- During its construction phase, the expansion project will employ about 2,000 people directly and indirectly, and once operational, about 25,000 people will be employed, the plan said.
- A multi-modal transport hub — which includes metro connectivity, multi-level car parking, cityside check-in and self-bag drop facility, and curbside facilities for passengers/visitors arriving at the airport from surrounding areas — will also be developed, it said.
- LIAL has proposed multi-level car parking to accommodate 4,000 car spaces, the plan noted.
- "Pedestrian walkways are planned to connect multi-level car parking to terminal departure and arrival areas, for passengers and greeters to park in multi-level car parking and walk down to the pick-up/drop off kerbs," it mentioned.
- About 9.6 million litres per day (MLD) of water would be required to handle 39 MPPA, it said. 4.5 MLD will be supplied by the Uttar Pradesh government or borewells and the remaining 5.1 will be sourced from the sewage treatment plant for landscaping and flushing, it added.
- New integrated cargo terminal with a capacity of 30,000 tonnes, new fuel storage facility with 5,000 KL capacity are among other key initiatives that have been planned at the Lucknow International Airport by the administration.

=== Aerocity ===
Aerocity project is a mixed-use development that comprises the following:

- Retail space (Multiplex, Entertainment, Virtual Reality, and F&B)
- Business Centre (Convention Center and Flexi Office)
- Hotel
- Associated connectivity, utilities and facilities

The total population of the project will be 31,108 persons.

Adequate provision will be made for the heavy vehicle parking at the project site to allow smooth movement at the site. The proposed parking area will be 4087 ECS.

The total project cost of the proposed City Side Development project is 1116.50 crores.

The Aero City will be constructed between the new Terminal 3 and the CCSIA Metro Station. Estimated date of completion for the project is 2026.

== Awards ==
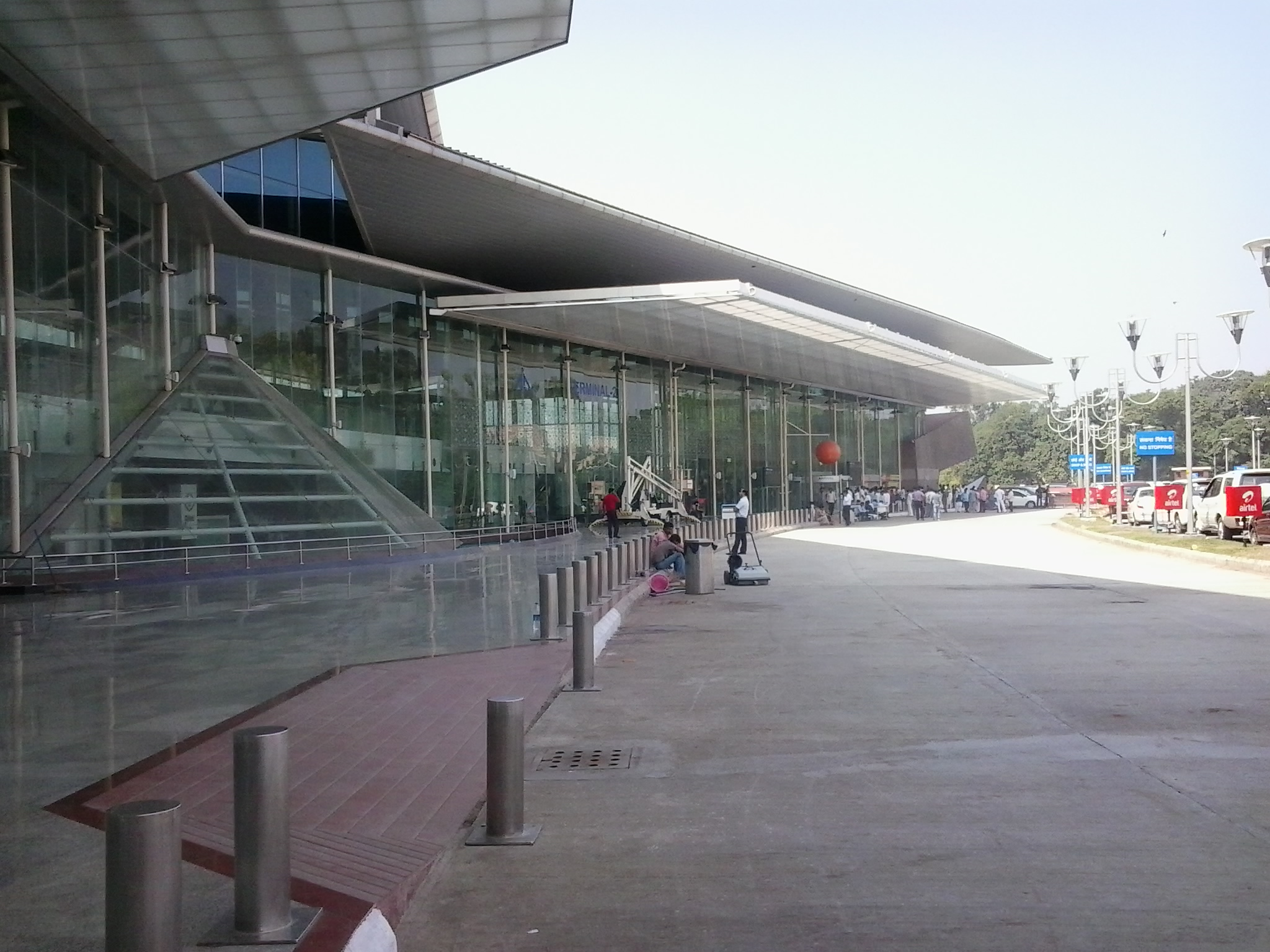
Terminal 2, CCS International Airport

- The airport was awarded AAI's "Best Airport" award in July 2013 along with Jodhpur Airport.
- Lucknow Airport was rated second-best in the category of small airports catering to 5–10 million passengers per annum by Airports Council International, a global non-profit organisation of airport operators.
- In 2018, Lucknow Airport was awarded the best airport in the category "Best Airport by Size and Region (2–5 million passengers per year in Asia-Pacific Region)" by the Airports Council International.
- The Passenger Terminal 2 Building's Architects, S. Ghosh & Associates were awarded the NDTV-Grohe Infrastructure Architecture Design of the Year Award in 2014 for the project.
- In 2019, the Airport was awarded first position in ASQ awards in Asia Pacific region for 5 to 15 million capacity pet annum by Airport Council International (ACI).
- In January 2021, Lucknow Airport was accredited in the Airports Council International (ACI) Airport Health Accreditation programme. The global recognition demonstrates extraordinary proactive measures put in place by the airport to ensure passenger safety.
- In January 2023, Assocham announced the best regional airport awards for Lucknow and Ahmedabad airports.

== See also ==
- Lal Bahadur Shastri International Airport
- Airports in India
- List of busiest airports in India
