= Chaudhary Charan Singh International Airport metro station =

Lucknow Metro's Red Line terminal metro station

CCSI Airport Metro Station
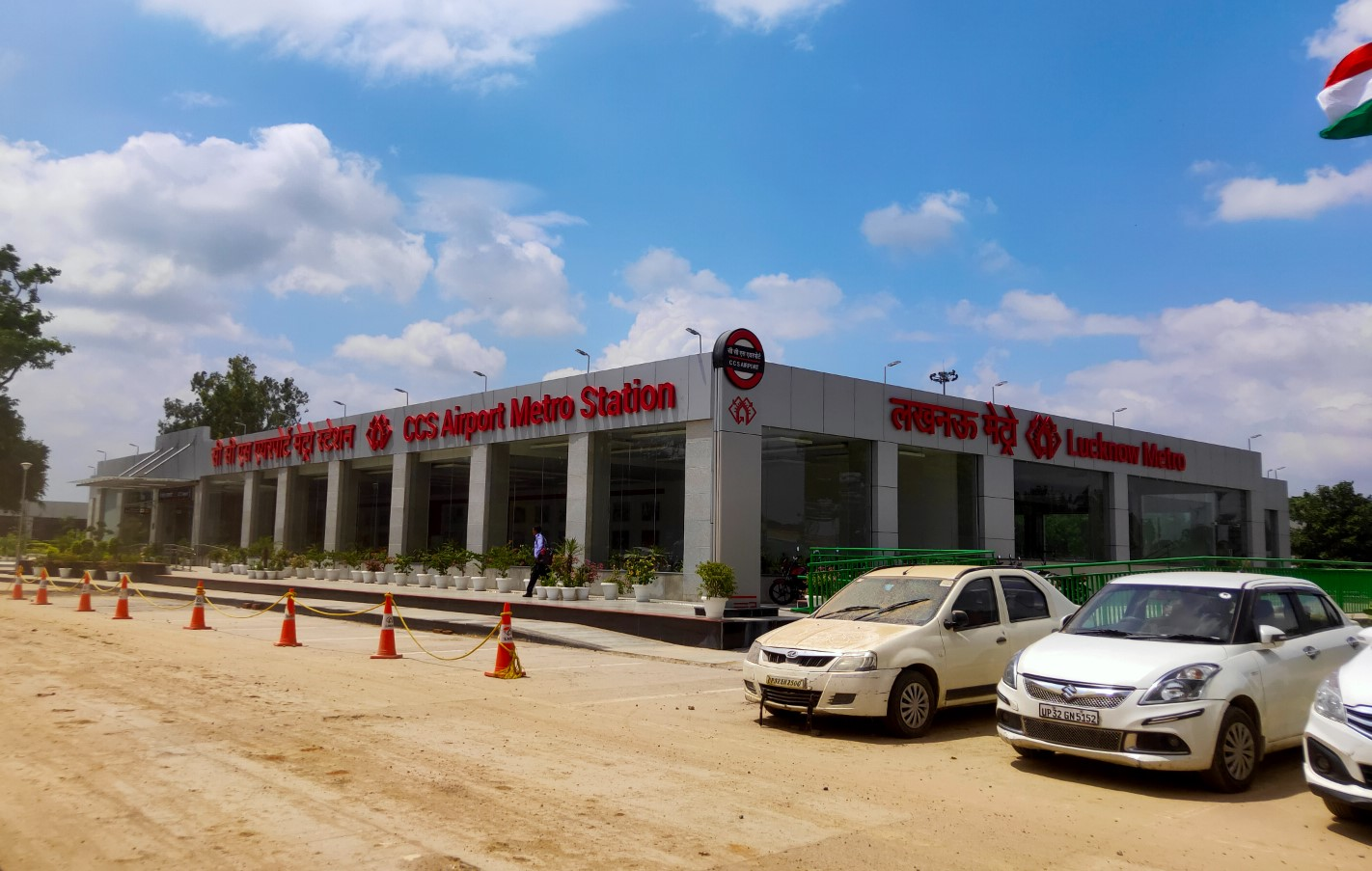

General information
- Location: Front of Terminal-2, CCSIA, Lucknow
- Coordinates: 26.766150°N 80.883561°E
- System: Lucknow Metro station
- Owner: Lucknow Metro
- Operator: Uttar Pradesh Metro Rail Corporation
- Line: Red Line
- Platforms: Side platform Platform-1 → Munshi Pulia; Platform-2 → Train Terminates Here
- Tracks: 2
- Connections: Chaudhary Charan Singh International Airport

Construction
- Structure type: Underground, Double track
- Platform levels: 2

History
- Opened: 8 March 2019; 7 years ago
- Electrified: Single-phase 25 kV 50 Hz AC through overhead catenary

Services
Preceding station	Lucknow Metro	Following station
Terminus	Red Line	Amausi towards Munshi Pulia
Route map
Location

Chaudhary Charan Singh International Airport is the southern terminal metro station on the North-South Corridor of the Red Line of Lucknow Metro providing connectivity with the Chaudhary Charan Singh International Airport to the other parts of the city. It was opened on 8 March 2019. It is located at the front of the T2 terminal of Lucknow International Airport.

== Station layout ==
G	Street level	Exit/Entrance
L1	Mezzanine	Fare control, station agent, Metro Card vending machines, crossover
L2	Side platform | Doors will open on the left
L2	Platform 2 Southbound	Towards → Train Terminates Here
L2	Platform 1 Northbound	Towards ← Munshi Pulia; Next Station: Amausi
L2	Side platform | Doors will open on the left
L2

== Connections ==
• Chaudhary Charan Singh International Airport

== See also ==
- Lucknow
- List of Lucknow Metro stations
- Uttar Pradesh State Road Transport Corporation
- Rapid Transit in India
- List of metro systems
