= Munshi Pulia metro station =

Lucknow Metro's Red Line terminal metro station

Munshi Pulia
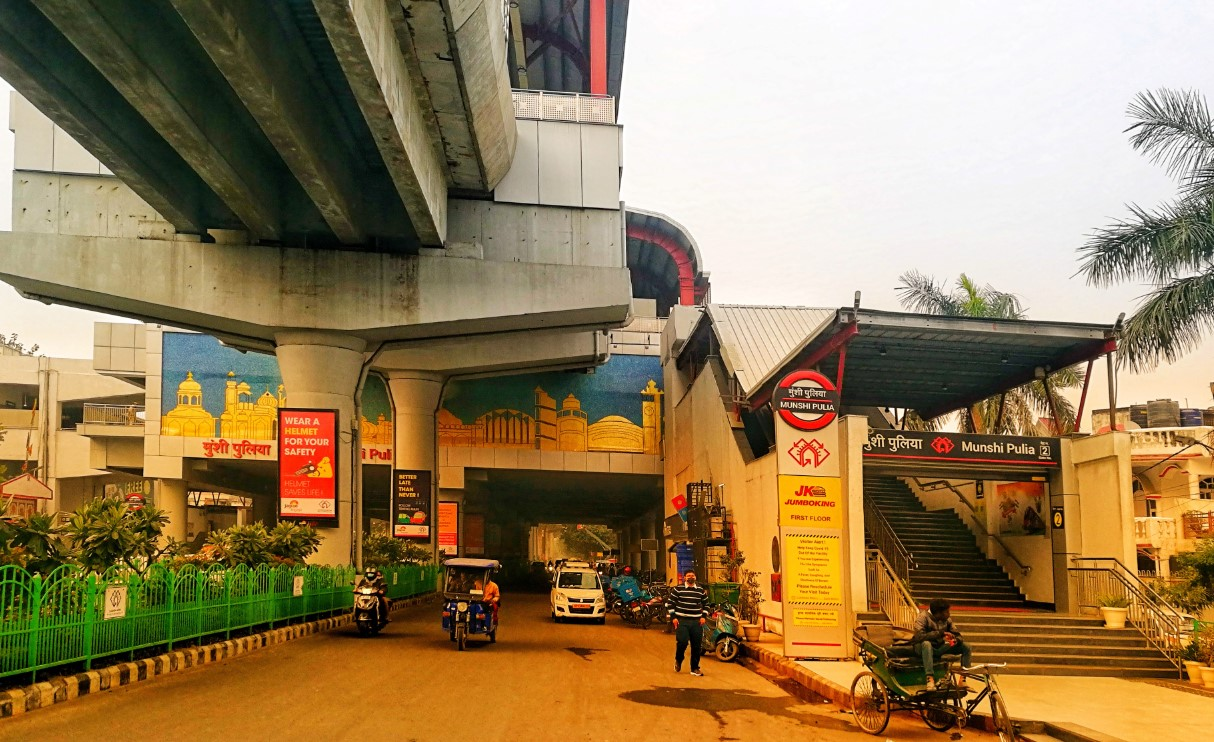

General information
- Location: Sector 16, Indira Nagar, Lucknow, Uttar Pradesh 226016
- Coordinates: 26.887856°N 80.995842°E
- System: Lucknow Metro station
- Owner: Lucknow Metro
- Operator: Uttar Pradesh Metro Rail Corporation
- Line: Red Line
- Platforms: Side platform Platform-1 → Train Terminates Here Platform-2 → CCS International Airport
- Tracks: 2

Construction
- Structure type: Elevated, double track
- Platform levels: 2

History
- Opened: 8 March 2019; 7 years ago
- Electrified: Single-phase 25 kV 50 Hz AC through overhead catenary

Services
Preceding station	Lucknow Metro	Following station
Indira Nagar towards CCS International Airport	Red Line	Terminus
Route map
Location

Munshi Pulia is the northern terminal metro station on the North-South Corridor of the Red Line of Lucknow Metro station in Lucknow, Uttar Pradesh, India. It is situated in the Sector-13, 14 and 16 of Indira Nagar colony. There are two entrances to the station, from the Sector-16 side and from the Sector-13 and 14 side.

The metro fare is Rs 40 from Munshi Puliya to Charbagh Railway station as against Rs 150–200 by taxi. From Munshi Pulia to Airport is Rs 60 while a taxi will charge around Rs 400 to 500.

== Station layout ==
G	Street level	Exit/Entrance
L1	Mezzanine	Fare control, station agent, Metro Card vending machines, crossover
L2	Side platform | Doors will open on the left
L2	Platform 2 Southbound	Towards → CCS International Airport; Next Station: Indira Nagar
L2	Platform 1 Northbound	Towards ← Train Terminates Here
L2	Side platform | Doors will open on the left
L2

== See also ==
- Lucknow
- List of Lucknow Metro stations
- Uttar Pradesh State Road Transport Corporation
- Rapid Transit in India
- List of metro systems
