= Uttar Pradesh State Road Transport Corporation =

Public road transport corporation in Uttar Pradesh, India

- Commenced operation: 15 May 1947; 79 years ago
- Locale: Uttar Pradesh
- Service area: Uttar Pradesh, Uttarakhand, Delhi, Bihar, Rajasthan, Punjab, Himachal Pradesh, Haryana, Jammu and Kashmir, Madhya Pradesh
- Routes: 3142
- Depots: 115
- Fleet: 14,110
- Fuel type: Diesel, Electric & CNG
- Operator: Department of Transport (Government of Uttar Pradesh)
- Website: UPSRTC

The Uttar Pradesh State Road Transport Corporation (UPSRTC) is a public sector passenger road transport corporation which services Uttar Pradesh, India, and adjoining states of North India. It operates as a state and interstate bus service and has the largest fleet of buses in North India. UPSRTC is the government-owned transport corporation, and its corporate office of the corporation is located at MG Marg in Lucknow.

== History ==
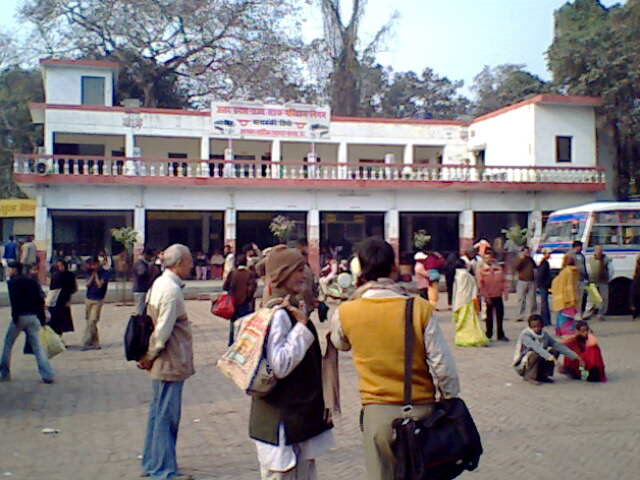
Barabanki UPSRTC (Uttar Pradesh State Road Transport Corporation) Bus Station.

Passenger road transport services in the state of U.P. started on 15th May, 1947 with the operation of bus service on the Lucknow - Barabanki route by the erstwhile U.P. Government Roadways. During the 4th five-year plan, the erstwhile UP Government Roadways was renamed as Uttar Pradesh State Road Transport Corporation (UPSRTC) on 1 June 1972 under the provisions of the Road Transport Act, 1950. The objectives of this undertaking were –

- The development of the road transport sector correlated to which would lead to the overall development of trade & industry.
- The coordination of the road transport services with other modes of transport.
- To provide an adequate, economical & efficiently coordinated road transport service to the residents of the state.

== Organizational setup ==
The Board of Directors, headed by the Chairperson, manage the Corporation through its Managing Director, who is its executive head. The current M.D. of UPSRTC is Shri Masoom Ali Sarwar, while the current Chairman is Shri Lakko Venkateshwarlu.

== Infrastructure ==
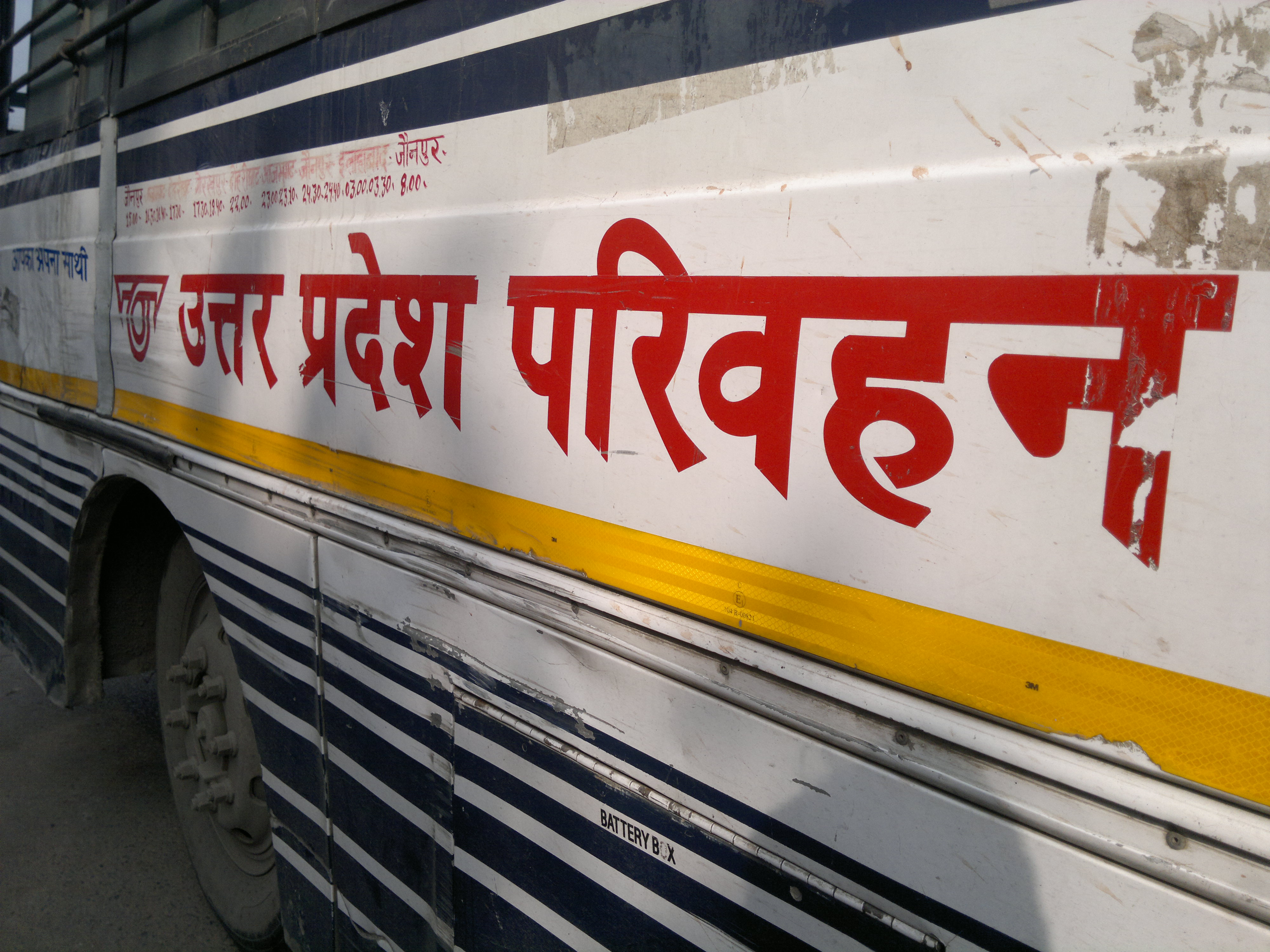
UPSRTC Logo

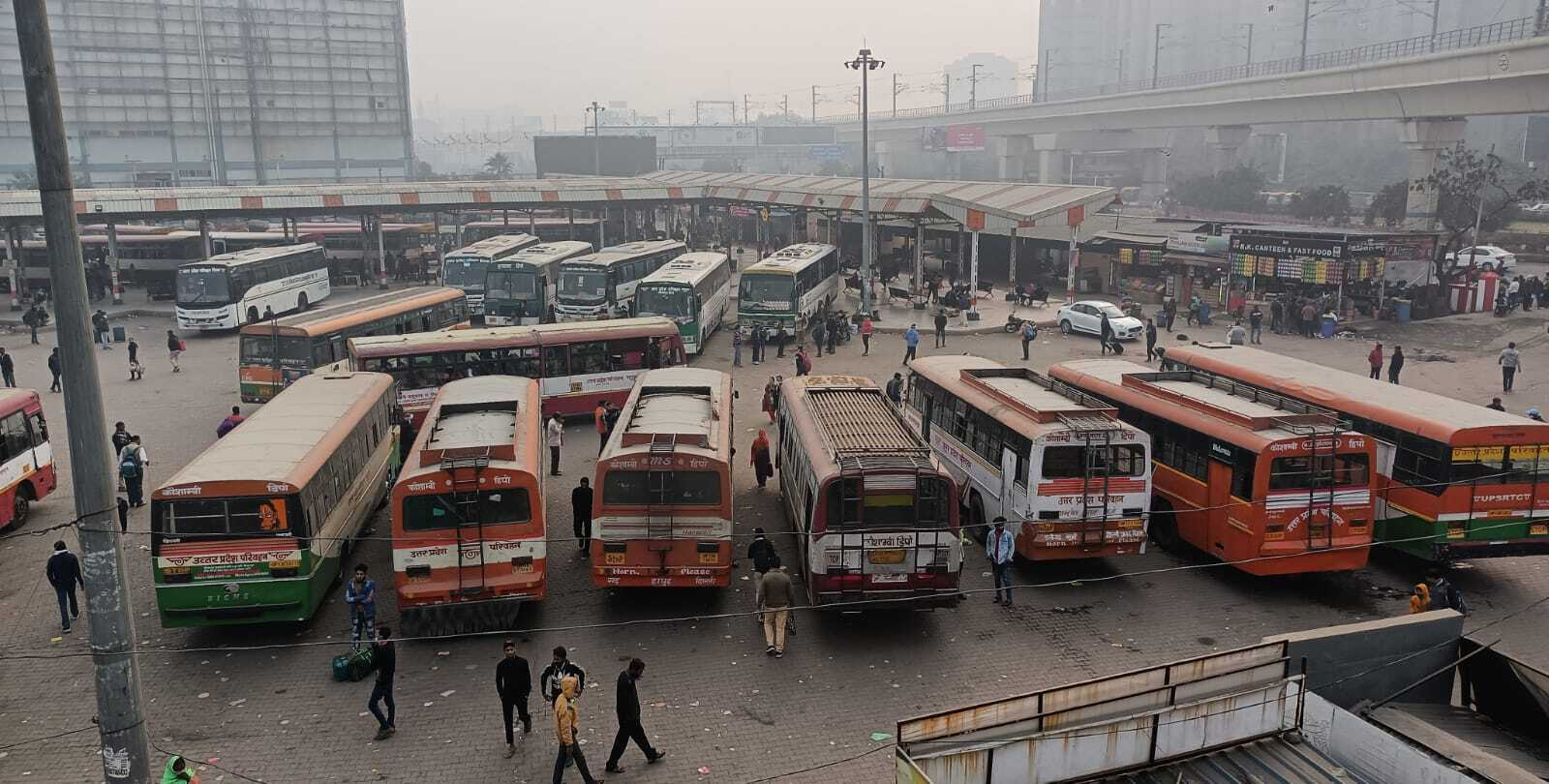
UPSRTC's Kaushambi bus depot

The corporation has been divided into 20 regions for efficient functioning, of which 1 region operates urban and suburban services. Each region has a regional workshop, where major repair and maintenance, as well as assembly and reconditioning, is performed. Each region has been further divided into operational units called depots, of which there are 115, including Car-Section. Each depot has a depot workshop attached to it to provide supportive maintenance facilities. The locations of the depots are as follows:

S. No.	Region	No. of Depots
1	Agra	6
2	Aligarh	7
3	Ayodhya	4
4	Azamgarh	7
5	Bareilly	4
6	Chitrakoot	4
7	Devipatan	3
8	Etawah	6
9	Ghaziabad	8
10	Gorakhpur	8
11	Hardoi	6
12	Jhansi	2
13	Kanpur	6
14	Lucknow	7
15	Meerut	5
16	Moradabad	8
17	Noida	2
18	Prayagraj	8
19	Saharanpur	6
20	Varanasi	8

For heavy maintenance and repair of vehicles, reconditioning of major assemblies, renovation of buses and construction of bodies on new chassis, two Central workshops have been established in Kanpur: Central Workshop, Rawatpur and Dr Ram Manohar Lohia Workshop, Allen Forest. Eight tyre re-treading plants are established at Agra, Lucknow, Gorakhpur, Ayodhya, Ghaziabad, Bareilly, Kanpur, Saharanpur, Prayagraj, Moradabad and Etawah to provide in-house tyre re-treading facilities. For repairs and maintenance of staff cars belonging to the State Government and the corporation, a separate unit named Car-Section is established in Lucknow. For imparting training to drivers and technical staff, a Training School is established in Kanpur. The state transport department is also an introducing Intelligent Transport Management System (ITMS) with a cost of Rs 38.28 crore of which 50 percent will be a grant from Government of India and the remaining 50 percent would come from private participation. With the implementation of ITMS, the entire transport department in the state would go online. UPSRTC had its own ISBT located at Lucknow.

== Bus stations ==
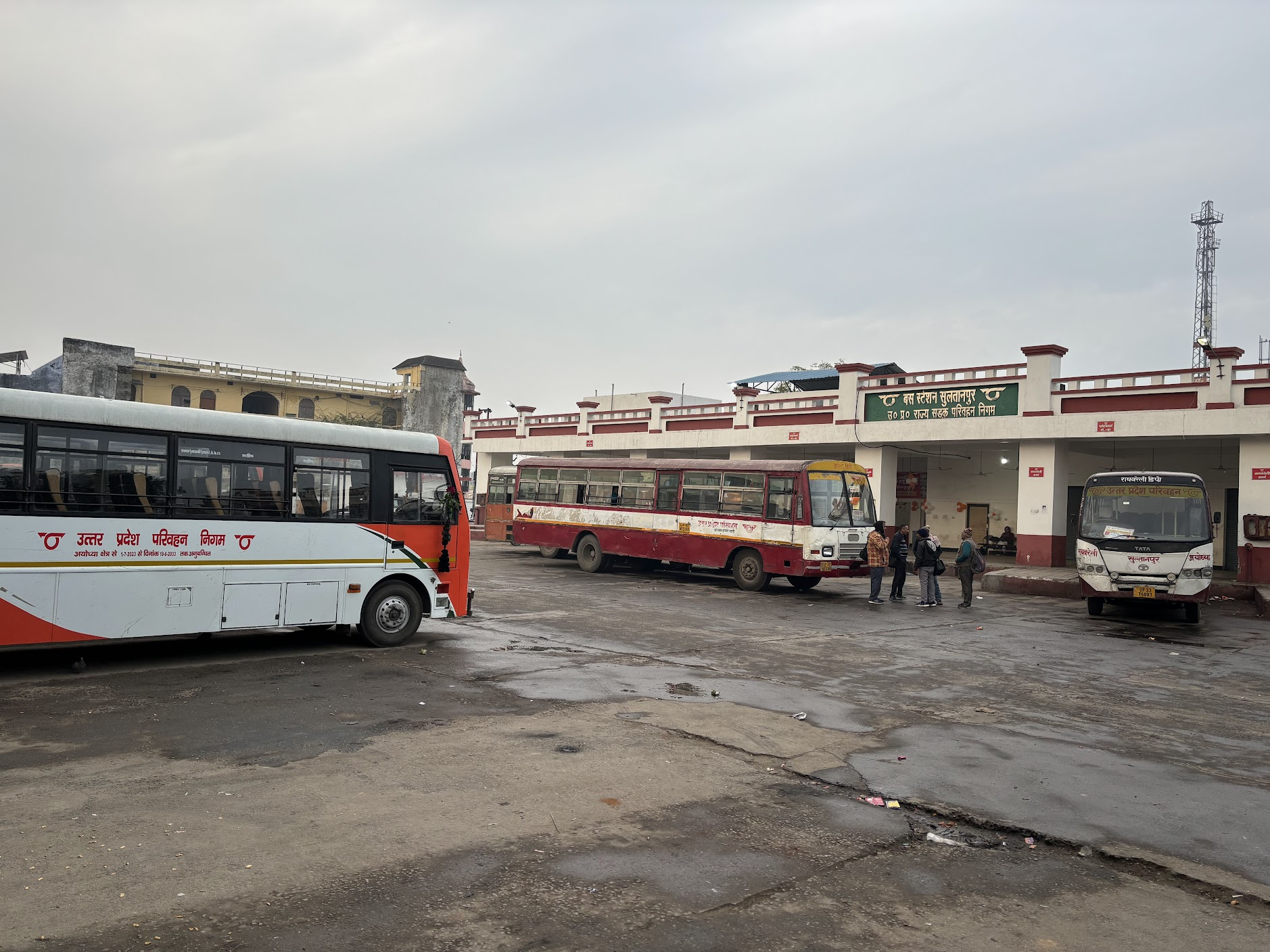
Sultanpur bus depot

The corporation has 300 bus stations of which 249 are in owned premises and 51 are in rented premises. For the convenience of passengers, the Corporation generally has restrooms, canteens, booking offices, toilets, drinking water facilities, timetables, chart displays, enquiry counters, public address systems, lights, fans, seats, benches etc at all its stations.

== Fleet ==
UPSRTC has a total fleet of 14,110 buses. Its buses operate over 3.51 million kilometers at 3142 routes catering to the travel needs of over 1.80 million people and earning over Rs.137.70 million every day.

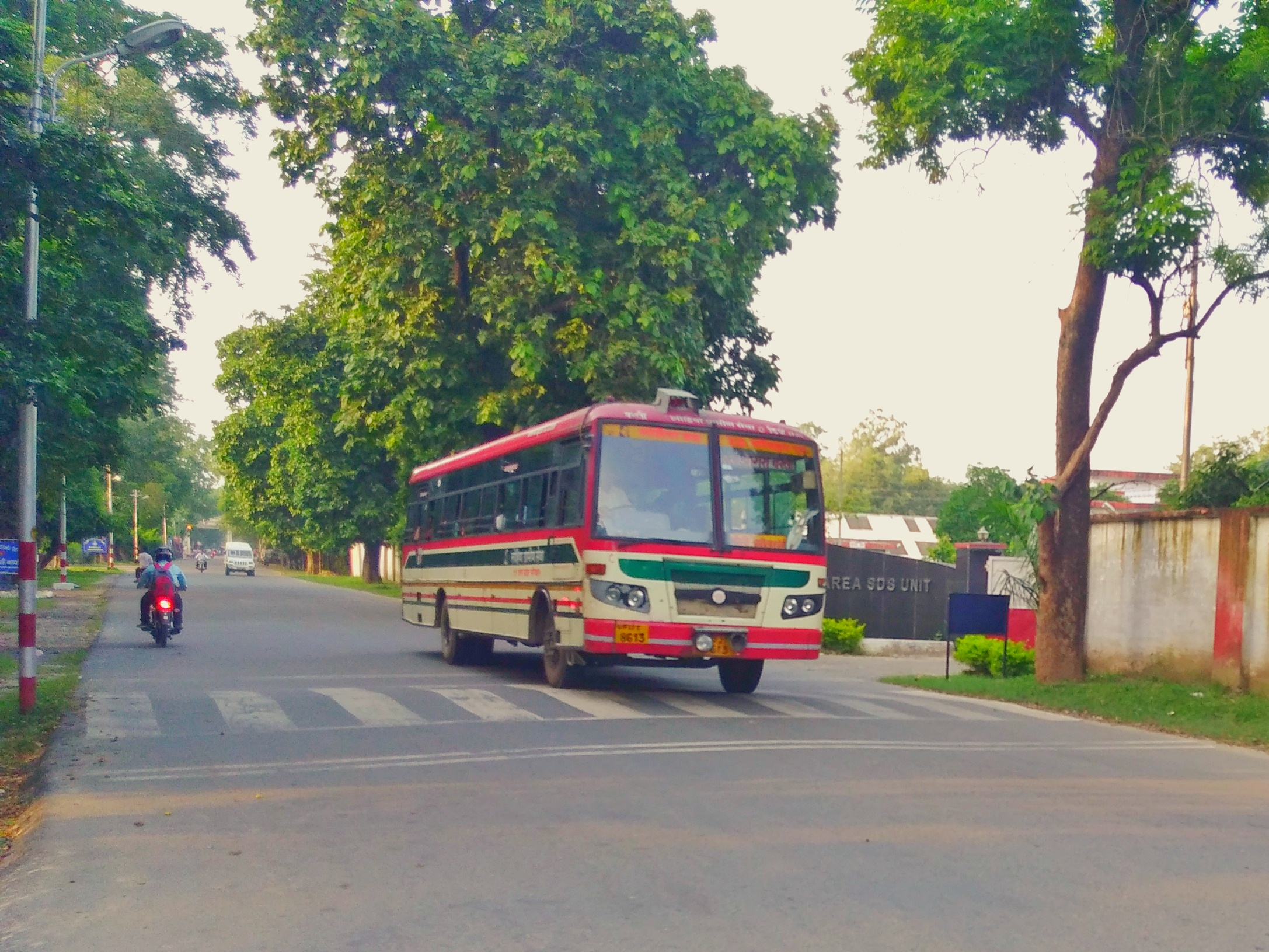
UPSRTC Bus in Bareilly Cantt

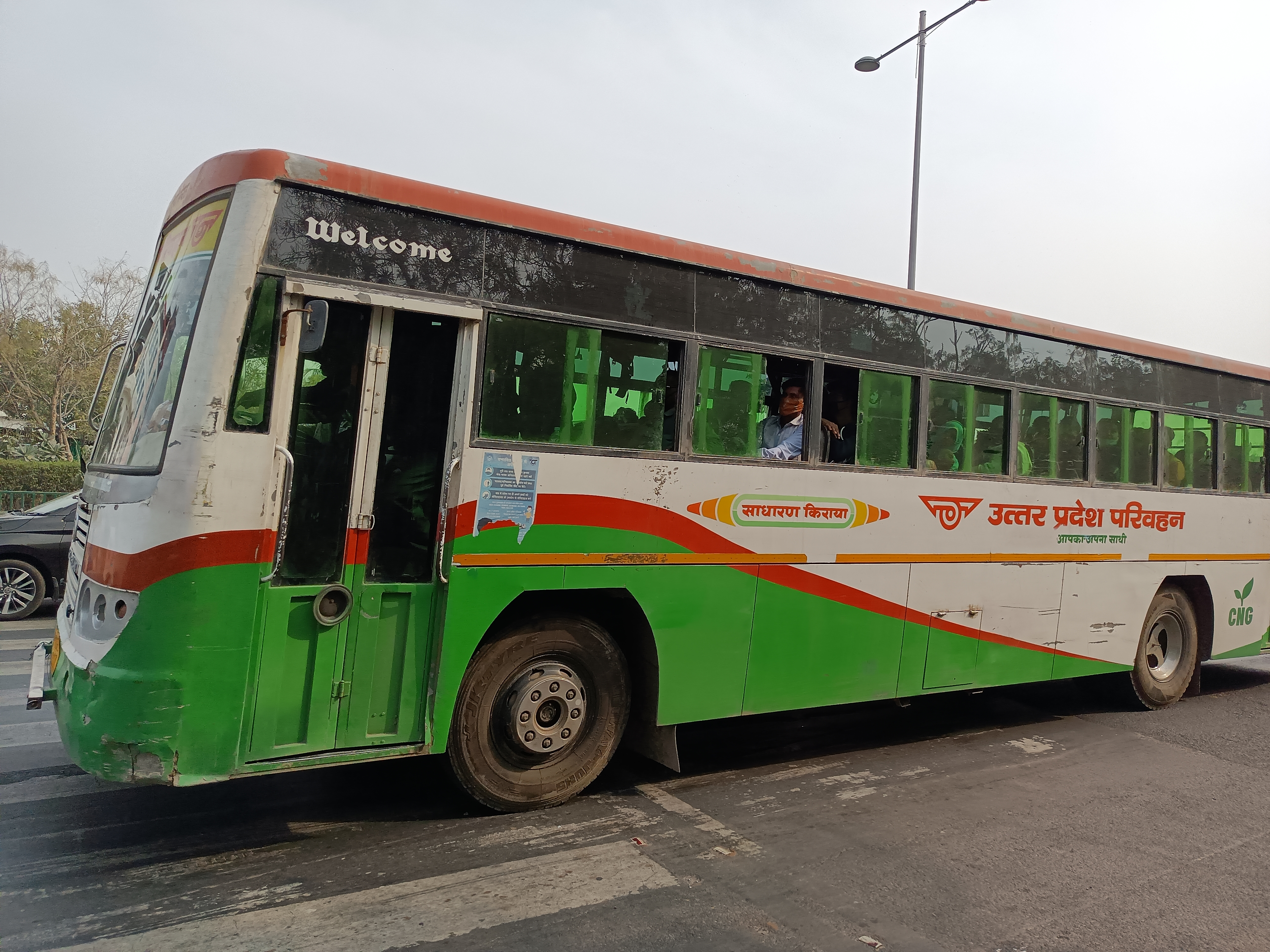
A UPSRTC CNG Bus

== Network ==
UPSRTC has the largest bus fleet in North India and operates interstate buses to eight neighboring states, viz., Uttarakhand, Delhi, Bihar, Chandigarh, Rajasthan, Punjab, Himachal Pradesh, Haryana, Jammu and Kashmir and Madhya Pradesh. There is a good network of interstate buses with an influx of passengers from proximate states. Its furthest places of operations in each direction are very far away. The northernmost point of operation is Katra, Jammu and Kashmir, the southernmost point is Indore, the easternmost point is Patna, while the westernmost point is Ajmer. Till these points, UPSRTC operates its regular bus services for passengers.

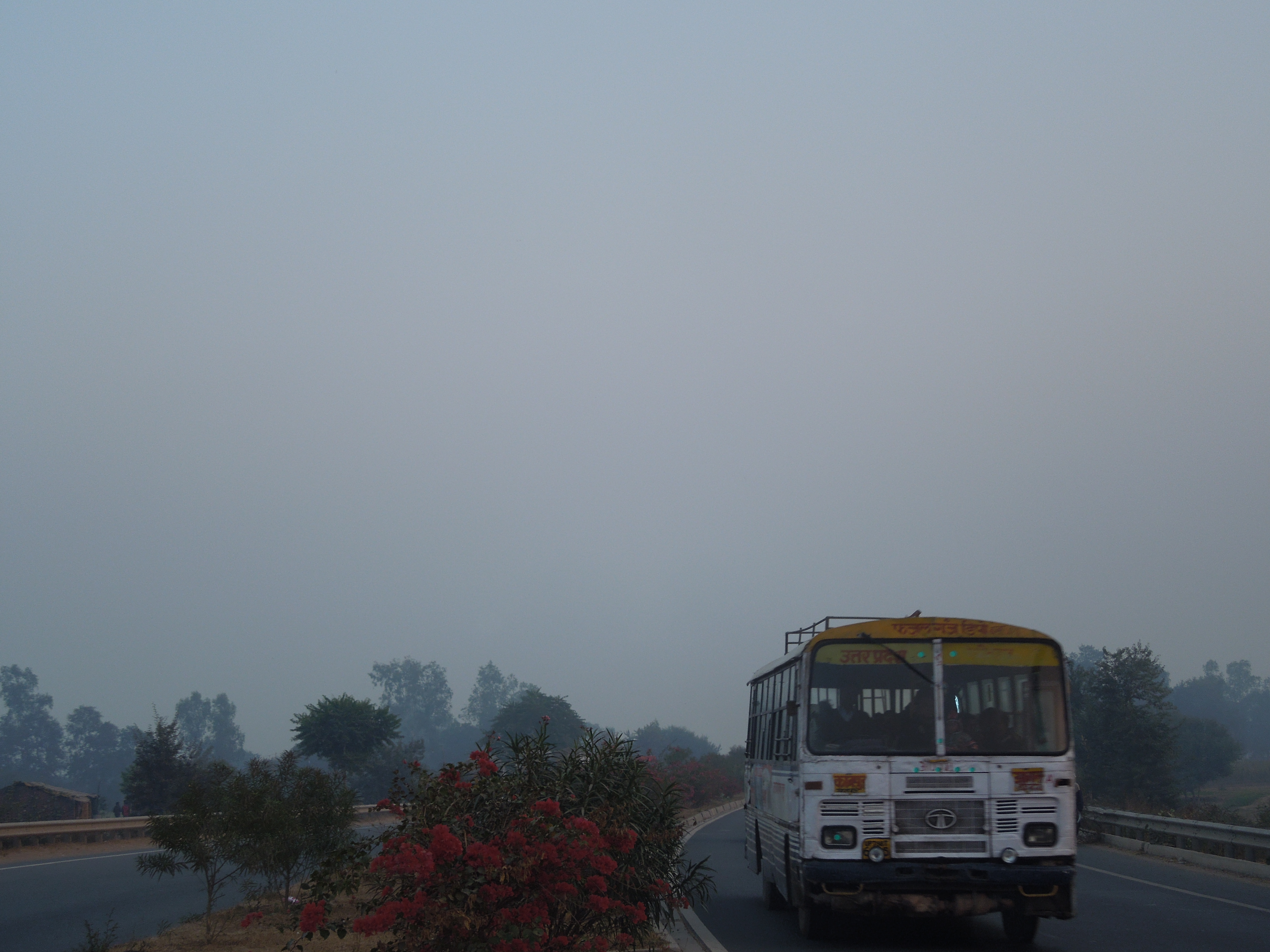
NH-2 a UPSRTC bus

== Types of buses ==
- LOHIA GRAMIN SEWA

Operates as shuttle service between district headquarters and nearby towns/villages/tehsils. Caters to rural and economy-conscious traffic. USP – Reduced fares (around 70% of fare of ordinary services) are charged.

- MINI

Operates as shuttle service between district headquarters and nearby towns/villages/tehsils. Caters to rural and time-conscious traffic. USP – Since it has 32 seats, gets filled up fast and reaches destination faster.

- ORDINARY

New comfortable buses operate between various districts. Caters to the general traffic. USP – Ordinary fares are charged.

- SUHANI SEWA

These buses have fixed stops & fixed time table and known for their punctuality and service.

- SANKALP SEWA

The bus service will connect interior areas with big cities, these public buses are in saffron colour.

- SLEEPER

New, comfortable, and AC non-AC Sleeper services for long routes. Operates between different long-distance destinations. USP – Has 28 seats on the lower tier and 15 berths on the upper tier.

- JANRATH

New, the low-cost AC bus service, very comfortable, AC and point to point services. Operates between different districts as direct services. The idea behind introducing these AC buses with reasonable fare is to make it affordable for low-income class people poor to enjoy this luxury without putting any burden on their pockets

- VOLVO

Spacious and comfortable 2*2 A/c Volvo buses for ease and comfort during the journey. 45 seater, spacious, state of the art Volvo buses with great comfort services between all districts, headquarters, and major routes.

== Awards and achievements ==
The Uttar Pradesh State Road Transport Corporation (UPSRTC) achieved a magnificent feat by setting a Guinness Book of World Records for the largest parade of buses anywhere in the world. As many as 500 special Kumbh Mela buses were paraded for this purpose in the city of Prayagraj in Uttar Pradesh. The fleet of 500 buses was paraded on a stretch of 3.2 kilometres. Observers from the Guinness Book of World Records were present at the scene and handed over the certificate. UPSRTC is going to give free travel of 4000 kilometer every year through smart card to such teachers working in the state who are honored with national or state award.
