= City Railway Station metro station (Lucknow) =

Proposed metro station in Uttar Pradesh, India

City Railway Station

General information
- Location: Lucknow; India
- Operator: Uttar Pradesh Metro Rail Corporation
- Line: Blue Line (Proposed)
- Connections: Lucknow City

Construction
- Depth: 14.160 m (46.46 ft)

Services
Preceding station	Lucknow Metro	Following station
Proposed
Pandeyganj towards Charbagh	Blue Line	Medical Chauraha towards Vasant Kunj

City Railway Station is a proposed Lucknow Metro station in Lucknow.
