= Balaganj metro station =

Metro station in Lucknow, India

General information
- Location: Lucknow; India
- Elevation: 12.807 m (42.02 ft)
- Operator: Uttar Pradesh Metro Rail Corporation
- Line: Blue Line (Proposed)

Services
Preceding station	Lucknow Metro	Following station
Proposed
Thakurganj towards Charbagh	Blue Line	Sarfarazganj towards Vasant Kunj

Balaganj is a proposed Lucknow Metro station in Lucknow.
