= Medical Chauraha metro station =

Proposed metro station in Lucknow, India

Medical Chauraha

General information
- Location: Lucknow; India
- Operator: Uttar Pradesh Metro Rail Corporation
- Line: Blue Line (Proposed)

Construction
- Depth: 13.704 m (44.96 ft)

Services
Preceding station	Lucknow Metro	Following station
Proposed
City Railway Station towards Charbagh	Blue Line	Nawazganj towards Vasant Kunj

Medical Chauraha is a proposed Lucknow Metro station in Lucknow.
