= Thakurganj metro station =

Metro station in Lucknow, India

Thakurganj

General information
- Location: Lucknow; India
- Elevation: 13.169 m (43.21 ft)
- Operator: Uttar Pradesh Metro Rail Corporation
- Line: Blue Line (Proposed)

Services
Preceding station	Lucknow Metro	Following station
Proposed
Nawazganj towards Charbagh	Blue Line	Balaganj towards Vasant Kunj

Thakurganj is a proposed Lucknow Metro station in Lucknow.
