= Tejas Express =

Series of Indian Semi-high speed train

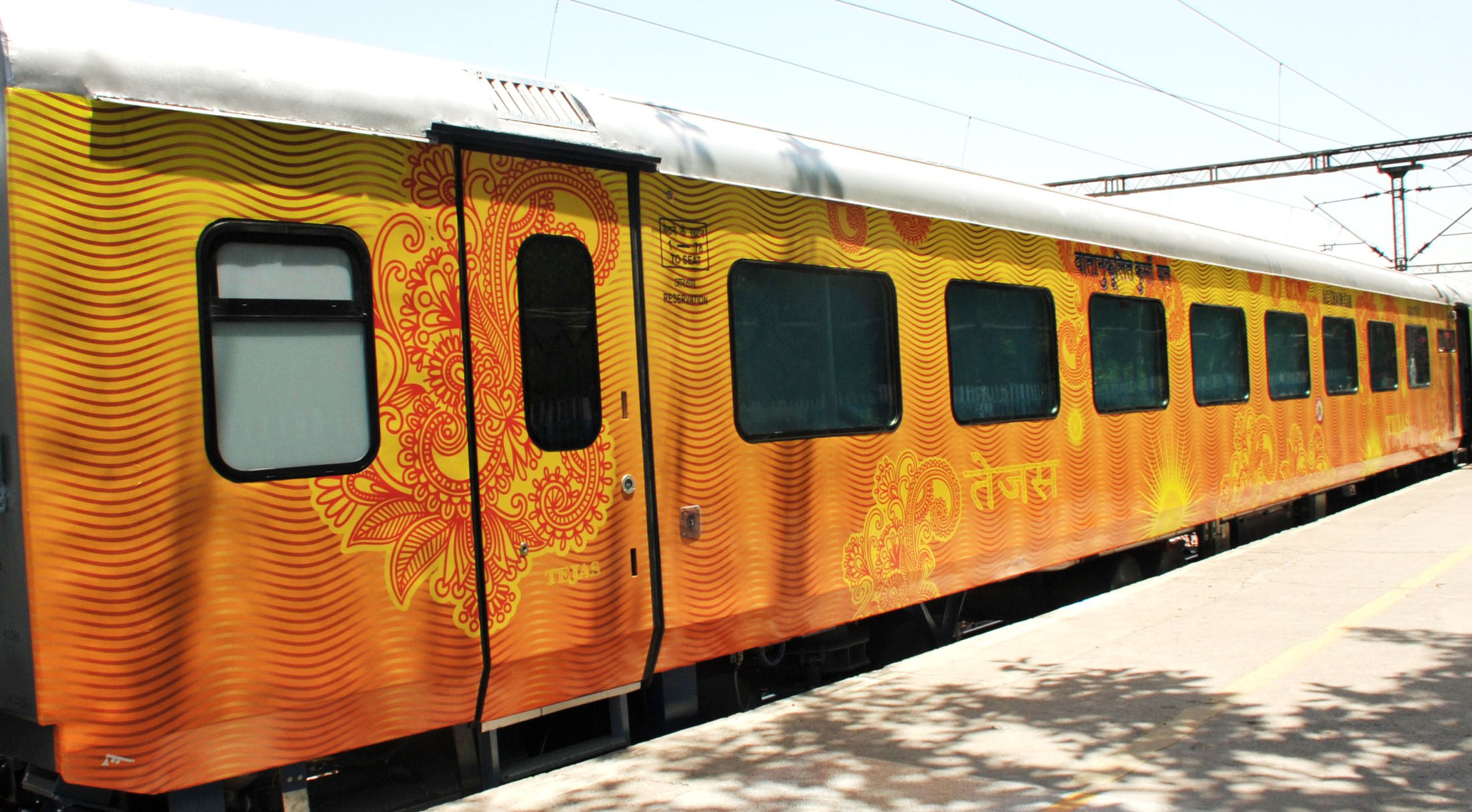
- Brand new Tejas Express coaches at Delhi Safdarjung railway station.

Overview
- Service type: Superfast
- Status: Active
- First service: 24 May 2017; 9 years ago
- Current operators: Indian Railways (Public); IRCTC (Corporate)
- Website: https://indianrail.gov.in

Route
- Line used: 4

On-board services
- Classes: Executive chair car (EC); AC chair car (CC)
- Seating arrangements: Yes
- Sleeping arrangements: Yes
- Catering facilities: On-board catering, Tea and coffee vending machines, Local cuisine, Celebrity chef menu
- Observation facilities: Large windows in all carriages; services operated by both state and corporate operators.
- Entertainment facilities: Magazines, Electric outlets, On-board Wi-Fi
- Baggage facilities: Overhead racks on Chair car rake Underneath storage of the bearths on Sleeper car rake
- Other facilities: Automatic doors, Smoke alarms, CCTV cameras, Hand dryers, Odour control system, Sensor based water taps, Bio-vacuum toilets, Water level indicators, Fire and smoke detection, Suppression system.

Technical
- Rolling stock: LHB-Tejas Rake
- Track gauge: Indian gauge 1,676 mm (5 ft 6 in)
- Electrification: 25 kV AC at 50 Hz
- Operating speed: 130 km/h (81 mph); Tested speed: 200 km/h (120 mph)

The Tejas Express is a semi-high speed fully air-conditioned train introduced by Indian Railways to connect major cities within a short time, skipping most of the stops, completing the journey before night. It features modern onboard facilities with doors which are operated automatically. Tejas means "sharpness", "lustre", or "brilliance" in many Indian languages. It is one of 3 semi-high speed trains running in India, the others being the Vande Bharat Express and the Gatimaan Express.

== History ==
The inaugural run of Tejas Express was on 24 May 2017 from Chhatrapati Shivaji Terminus, Maharashtra to Karmali, Goa. It covered 552 km in 8 hours and 30 minutes. On 1 March 2019, the second Tejas Express of the country was flagged off between Chennai Egmore and Madurai Junction by Prime Minister Narendra Modi. It covered 497 km in 6 hours and 30 minutes.

The Lucknow – New Delhi route (currently running) has been included in the current Trains at Glance, the official train time-table booklet, with "Date of Introduction to be declared" condition. At the same time news websites have quoted railway officials saying a hold of three years. Meanwhile, the train service which was expected to be launched on Mumbai – Surat and New Delhi- Jalandhar route has also been put on hold.

Lucknow – New Delhi Tejas Express, which was inaugurated on 4 October 2019, is India's first train operated by private operators, IRCTC, a subsidiary of Indian Railways.

The Ahmedabad – Mumbai Tejas express, also operated by IRCTC, was inaugurated on 17 January 2020.

== Technical specifications ==
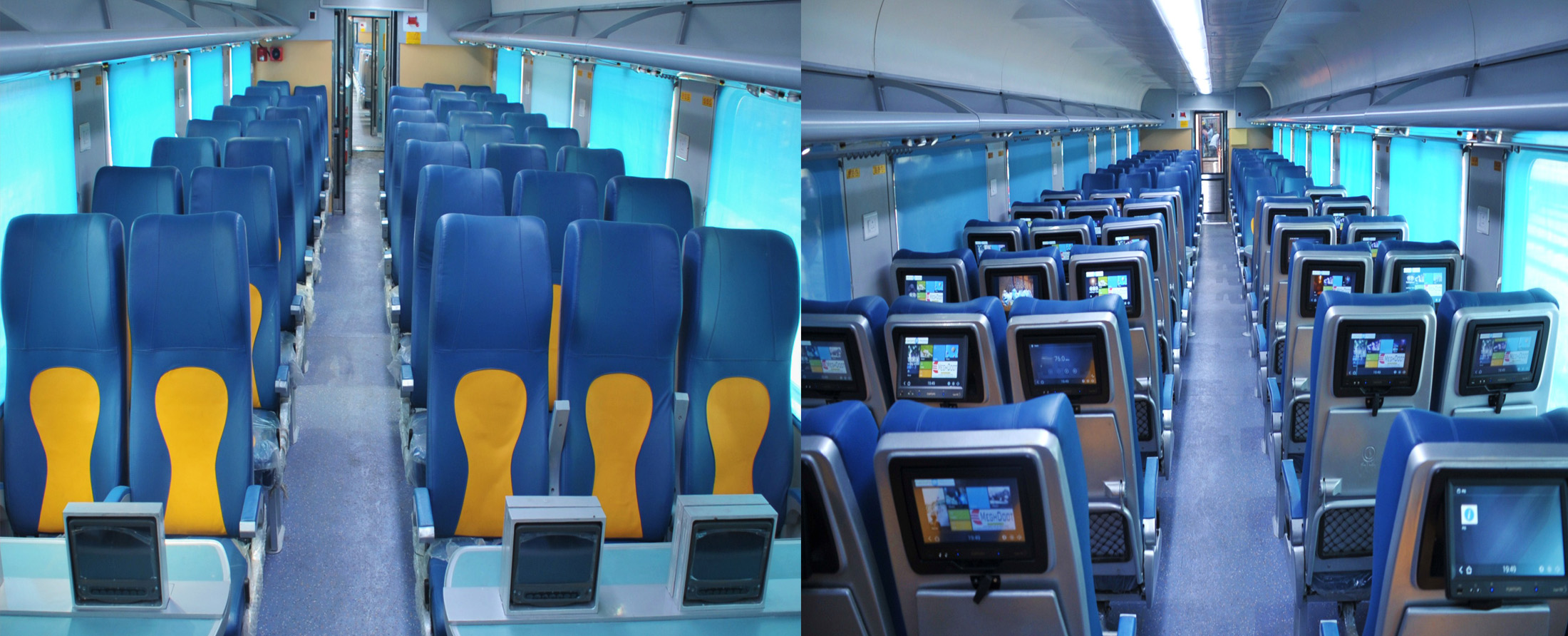
Interior of the Tejas Express,

The coaches of the first Tejas Express of India, which runs between Chhatrapati Shivaji Terminus (CSMT), Mumbai and Karmali are manufactured at Rail Coach Factory, Kapurthala in Kapurthala district of Punjab. The coaches of the second Tejas express, which runs between Chennai Egmore and Madurai, were manufactured at Integral Coach Factory, Chennai. The train is designed to run at a maximum speed of 200 km/h (120 mph) but the maximum operating speed allowed is 130 km/h (81 mph) due to track and safety constraints. Presently, the train runs at an average speed of 65 km/h (40 mph).

There are 14 non-executive chair cars and they can seat up to 72 passengers each in 3+2 configuration. The coaches have energy-efficient LED lights and digital destination display boards. It also has two executive chair cars in 2+2 configuration. The executive chair cars have a seating capacity of 56 passengers with adjustable head-rests, arm support and leg support. The leg support is not available in non-executive chair cars. The seats on tejas express are also very comfortable in terms of height on the contrary of regular AC chair car seats.

Coaches have bio-vacuum toilets, water level indicators, tap sensors, hand dryers, integrated braille displays, LED TV for each passenger with phone sockets, local cuisine, celebrity chef menu, WiFi, tea & coffee vending machines, magazines, snack tables, CCTV cameras, fire & smoke detection and suppression system. The fares will be 20% to 30% more than Shatabdi fares. The Tejas Express has redesigned seats with eco-leather. Toilets are equipped with soap dispensers, touch-less water taps, odour-control systems and occupancy indicators. Doors are centrally controlled.

== Routes ==
S. No.	Train No.	Originating Station	Terminal Station	Halts	Frequency	Distance	Travel Time	Average Speed	Inauguration	Operator
1	22119/22120	CSMT Mumbai	Madgaon Jn	7	5 Days/wk	580 km (360 mi)	09h 10m	63 km/h (39 mph)	24 May 2017	Indian Railways
2	22671/22672	Chennai Egmore	Madurai Jn	3	Except Thursday	493 km (306 mi)	06h 15m	79 km/h (49 mph)	1 March 2019	Indian Railways
3	82501/82502	Lucknow	New Delhi	3	Except Tuesday	512 km (318 mi)	06h 15m	82 km/h (51 mph)	4 October 2019	IRCTC
4	82901/82902	Ahmedabad	Mumbai Central	6	Except Thursday	492 km (306 mi)	06h 25m	77 km/h (48 mph)	17 January 2020	IRCTC

== See also ==
- AC Superfast Express
- Bullet train (Mumbai-Ahmedabad)
- Vande Bharat Express
- Gatimaan Express
- Humsafar Express
- Mahamana Express
- Double Decker Express
- Duronto Express
- Rajdhani Express
- Shatabdi Express
- Jan Shatabdi Express
- Garib Rath Express
- Antyodaya Express
- Uday Express
- Yuva Express
- Ramayana Express
