= Pandeyganj metro station =

Proposed metro station in Lucknow, India

Pandeyganj

General information
- Location: Lucknow; India
- Operator: Uttar Pradesh Metro Rail Corporation
- Line: Blue Line (Proposed)

Construction
- Depth: 19.414 m (63.69 ft)

Services
Preceding station	Lucknow Metro	Following station
Proposed
Aminabad towards Charbagh	Blue Line	City Railway Station towards Vasant Kunj

Pandeyganj is a proposed Lucknow Metro station in Lucknow.
