= Sarfarazganj metro station =

Metro station in Lucknow, India

Sarfarazganj

General information
- Location: Lucknow; India
- Elevation: 12.275 m (40.27 ft)
- Operator: Uttar Pradesh Metro Rail Corporation
- Line: Blue Line (Proposed)

Services
| Preceding station | Lucknow Metro | Following station |
Proposed
| Balaganj towards Charbagh | Blue Line | Musabagh towards Vasant Kunj |

Sarfarazganj is a proposed Lucknow Metro station in Lucknow. It is a small locality on the Hardoi Road in the outskirts of Lucknow. In recent years, it has many residential and commercial complexes coming up here. One of the major landmarks here is the Era Medical college and hospital.
