= Aminabad metro station =

Proposed metro station

Aminabad

General information
- Location: Lucknow; India
- Operator: Uttar Pradesh Metro Rail Corporation
- Line: Blue Line (Proposed)

Construction
- Depth: 15.691 m (51.48 ft)

Services
Preceding station	Lucknow Metro	Following station
Proposed
Gautam Buddha Marg towards Charbagh	Blue Line	Pandeyganj towards Vasant Kunj

Aminabad is a proposed Lucknow Metro station in Lucknow.
