= Nawazganj metro station =

Metro station in Lucknow, India

Nawazganj

General information
- Location: Lucknow; India
- Operator: Uttar Pradesh Metro Rail Corporation
- Line: Blue Line (Proposed)

Construction
- Depth: 13.824 m (45 ft 4.3 in)

Services
Preceding station	Lucknow Metro	Following station
Proposed
Medical Chauraha towards Charbagh	Blue Line	Thakurganj towards Vasant Kunj

Nawazganj is a proposed Lucknow Metro station in Lucknow.
