= Ahmedabad–Mumbai Central Tejas Express =

Tejas Express train operating by IRCTC, India

Ahmedabad Junction – Mumbai Central IRCTC Tejas Express
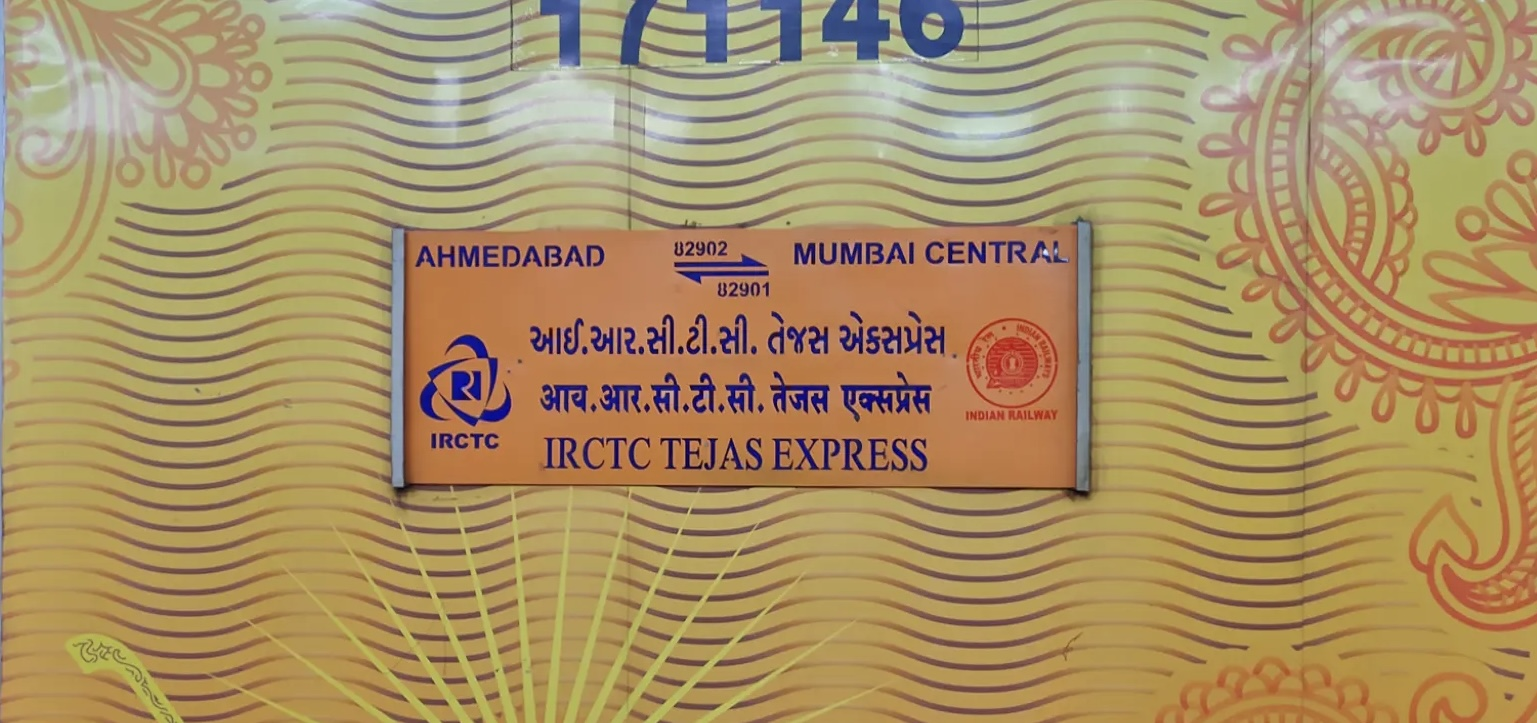
- Ahmedabad - Mumbai Central Tejas Express train board.

Overview
- Service type: Tejas Express
- Locale: Gujarat & Maharashtra
- First service: 17 January 2020; 6 years ago
- Current operators: IRCTC & Indian Railways

Route
- Termini: Ahmedabad Junction (ADI); Mumbai Central (MMCT)
- Stops: 6
- Distance travelled: 493 km (306 mi)
- Average journey time: 6 hours 30 minutes
- Service frequency: 6 days a week (Note: Except Thursdays)
- Train number: 82901 / 82902
- Line used: Ahmedabad–Mumbai main line

On-board services
- Classes: AC Executive Class, AC Chair Car
- Disabled access: Disabled access
- Seating arrangements: Yes
- Sleeping arrangements: No
- Auto-rack arrangements: Overhead racks
- Catering facilities: On-board catering
- Observation facilities: Large windows
- Entertainment facilities: Yes
- Baggage facilities: Below the seats
- Other facilities: Smoke alarms; CCTV cameras; Baby changing table; Odour-control system; Passenger information system

Technical
- Rolling stock: LHB Tejas rake
- Track gauge: 5 ft 6 in (1,676 mm) Broad Gauge
- Operating speed: 130 km/h (81 mph) maximum speed, 78 km/h (48 mph) average including halts.

The 82901 / 82902 Ahmedabad–Mumbai Central Tejas Express is a train on the Ahmedabad–Mumbai route. It is a semi-high speed, fully air-conditioned train Introduced by Indian Railways connecting Ahmedabad to Mumbai along with six stations named Nadiad, Vadodara, Bharuch, Surat, Vapi, and Borivali. This train started running from 19 January 2020. The fare of the train will be dynamic.

Since its inauguration, this train is India's second private train after Lucknow–New Delhi Tejas Express, both operated by IRCTC.

== Facilities ==
For the first time entertainment facilities have been introduced in Indian Railways. The Ahmedabad–Mumbai Tejas is the first Indian train to have LCD screens for each individual passengers though this facility will be available only in Executive Chair Car. In the LCD passengers can enjoy Hindi, Marathi, Gujarati movies, listen music as well as Passenger Information System is also available. Moreover, passengers can enjoy on-board free WiFi facilities.

== Traction ==
Earlier was WDG-4. It is hauled by a Vadodara Loco Shed-based WAP-7 or WAP-5 electric locomotive from end to end.
