= Lucknow railway station =

Lucknow railway station may refer to two adjacent stations in India:

- Lucknow Charbagh railway station or Lucknow NR (LKO), the larger of the two
- Lucknow Junction railway station or Lucknow NER (LJN), also in Charbagh
