= City Railway Station metro station =

City Railway Station metro station may refer to:

- City Railway Station metro station (Bangalore)
- City Railway Station metro station (Lucknow)
- Chengzhan station (literally "City Railway Station station") in Hangzhou
