= Blue Line (Lucknow Metro) =

Metro line in Lucknow, India

Blue Line ब्लू लाइन

Overview
- Status: Under Construction
- Locale: Lucknow, Uttar Pradesh, India
- Termini: Charbagh; Vasant Kunj
- Stations: 12

Service
- Type: Rapid transit
- System: Lucknow Metro
- Operator(s): Uttar Pradesh Metro Rail Corporation

Technical
- Line length: 11.098 km (6.90 mi)
- Character: Underground & Elevated
- Track gauge: 1,435 mm (4 ft 8 1/2 in) standard gauge
- Electrification: 25 kV 50 Hz AC overhead catenary

The Blue Line (Line 2) (Hindi: ब्लू लाइन) of the Lucknow Metro is an approved metro route of mass rapid transit system in Lucknow. It is also known East-West Corridor consists of 12 metro stations from Lucknow Charbagh Railway Station to Vasant Kunj with a total distance of 11.098 km.

== List of stations ==
Following is a list of stations on this route:

Blue Line
#	Station Name		Opening	Connections	Station Layout	Platform Level Type
#	English	Hindi	Opening	Connections	Station Layout	Platform Level Type
1	Charbagh	चारबाग़ रेलवे स्टेशन	2029	Red Line; Lucknow Charbagh	Underground	TBD
2	Gautam Buddha Marg	गौतम बुद्ध मार्ग	2029	None	Underground	TBD
3	Aminabad	अमीनाबाद	2029	None	Underground	TBD
4	Pandeyganj	पांडे गंज	2029	None	Underground	TBD
5	City Railway Station	सिटी रेलवे स्टेशन	2029	Lucknow City	Underground	TBD
6	Medical Chauraha	मेडिकल चौराहा	2029	None	Underground	TBD
7	Nawazganj	नवाज़गंज	2029	None	Underground	TBD
8	Thakurganj	ठाकुरगंज	2029	None	Elevated	TBD
9	Balaganj	बालागंज	2029	None	Elevated	TBD
10	Sarfarazganj	सरफ़राज़गंज	2029	None	Elevated	TBD
11	Musabagh	मूसा बाग़	2029	None	Elevated	TBD
12	Vasant Kunj	वसंत कुंज	2029	None	Elevated	TBD

== See also ==
- Lucknow
- Uttar Pradesh
- List of Lucknow Metro stations
- Red Line (Lucknow Metro)
- Uttar Pradesh Metro Rail Corporation
- Uttar Pradesh State Road Transport Corporation
- List of rapid transit systems in India
- List of Metro Systems
- Timeline of Lucknow Metro
