= Musabagh metro station =

Proposed metro station in Lucknow, India

Musabagh

General information
- Location: Lucknow; India
- Elevation: 12.857 m (42.18 ft)
- Operator: Uttar Pradesh Metro Rail Corporation
- Line: Blue Line (Proposed)

Services
Preceding station	Lucknow Metro	Following station
Proposed
Sarfarazganj towards Charbagh	Blue Line	Vasant Kunj Terminus

Musabagh is a proposed Lucknow Metro station in Lucknow.
