= Gautam Buddha Marg metro station =

Metro station in Lucknow, India

Gautam Buddha Marg

General information
- Location: Lucknow; India
- Elevation: 14.600 m (47.90 ft)
- Operator: Uttar Pradesh Metro Rail Corporation
- Line: Blue Line (Approved)

Services
Preceding station	Lucknow Metro	Following station
Proposed
Charbagh Terminus	Blue Line	Aminabad towards Vasant Kunj

Gautam Buddha Marg is an upcoming Lucknow Metro station in Lucknow.

== History ==
Construction of the Lucknow Metro Blue Line was approved in April 2010. Speculative names of the stations were announced in August 2013, and construction of the line was approved in October that year. Bids were settled in July 2026, groundbreaking is scheduled for October 2026, and the line is scheduled to open in 2027.
