= Indian Railway Catering and Tourism Corporation =

Indian online ticketing, catering and tourism company

- Type: Public
- Traded as: BSE: 542830; NSE: IRCTC
- ISIN: INE335Y01012
- Industry: Railways
- Founded: 27 September 1999; 27 years ago
- Headquarters: New Delhi, India
- Area served: India
- Key people: Rahul Himalian (Chairman & MD)
- Products: Rail Neer
- Services: Online ticketing; Catering; Tourism; Travel agency
- Revenue: ▲₹52.15 billion (US$560 million) (2025-26)
- Operating income: ▲₹18.75 billion (US$200 million) (2025-26)
- Net income: ▲₹13.93 billion (US$150 million) (2025-26)
- Owner: Government of India (62.4%)
- Members: 70.6 million registered users (August 2026)
- Website: www.irctc.co.in

Indian Railway Catering and Tourism Corporation (IRCTC) is an Indian public sector undertaking that provides ticketing, catering, and tourism services for the state-owned Indian Railways and as well as travel agency services. It was established in 1999 by the Government of India and operates under the administrative control of the Ministry of Railways. In 2019, IRCTC was listed on the National Stock Exchange and the Bombay Stock Exchange. The Indian government subsequently divested a further 5% of its shareholding in 2022 and, as of 2026, holds approximately 62.4% of the company's shares. As of August 2026, IRCTC has 70.6 million registered users, with an average of 1.56 million tickets booked each day.

== History ==
Indian Railway Catering and Tourism Corporation (IRCTC) was established on 27 September 1999, as a public sector undertaking wholly owned by the Government of India through the Indian Railways. In May 2008, it was granted Miniratna status, giving it a certain degree of financial autonomy. In 2018, then Railway Minister Piyush Goyal stated that the government was exploring opportunities for disinvestment of IRCTC.

The company was listed on the National Stock Exchange and Bombay Stock Exchange in 2019, following which the Government of India's stake was reduced to 87%, with the remaining shares traded publicly. In December 2020, the government divested a further 20% of its stake, reducing its holding to 67%. In December 2022, the government divested a further 5%, reducing its ownership to 62.4%. In March 2025, IRCTC was granted Navaratna status by the Government of India.

== Services ==
=== Ticketing and information ===
Online ticketing for Indian Railways was introduced through IRCTC on 3 August 2002. IRCTC offers ticket booking through its website, mobile applications, and SMS. Electronic tickets (e-tickets) can be used for travel with a valid photo identification document and can only be cancelled online. Internet tickets (I-tickets) are booked online and delivered as physical tickets by post.

Reserved tickets may be booked up to 60 days in advance. Upon successful booking of a confirmed e-ticket, IRCTC issues a unique passenger name record (PNR) number along with the details of the passengers and the allocated berth or seat number(s). Unconfirmed bookings are assigned a wait-list (WL) number, with different categories based on the journey and passenger quota, including Roadside Station Waiting List (RSWL), Remote Location Waiting List (RLWL), Pooled Quota Waiting List (PQWL), and General Waiting List (GNWL). Wait-listed tickets may be confirmed following cancellations of already reserved tickets in the respective travel classes and are automatically cancelled if they remain unconfirmed before departure.

Reservation Against Cancellation (RAC) is an intermediate status that allows passengers to board the train and share a berth with another passenger in the sleeper classes. The Tatkal quota (TQ) allows short-notice bookings of a specific number of seats in select trains at higher fares a day before departure and has a separate Tatkal Waiting List (TQWL). Confirmed tatkal tickets are non-refundable on cancellation.

In 2011, IRCTC launched the 'Shubh Yatra' loyalty programme offering discounts to frequent travelers for an annual subscription fee. In 2012, IRCTC introduced the 'Rolling Deposit Scheme' (RDS), a closed-wallet system for booking tickets using preloaded funds. In 2013, flight and hotel booking services were added. In 2016, IRCTC launched a lighter version of its website to enable booking at low-speed internet connections. On 7 August 2019, IRCTC launched the 'iMudha' payment wallet, and introduced a smart-card system for purchasing unreserved tickets at stations or online on 11 August 2021. It also provides train and ticketing information through SMS.

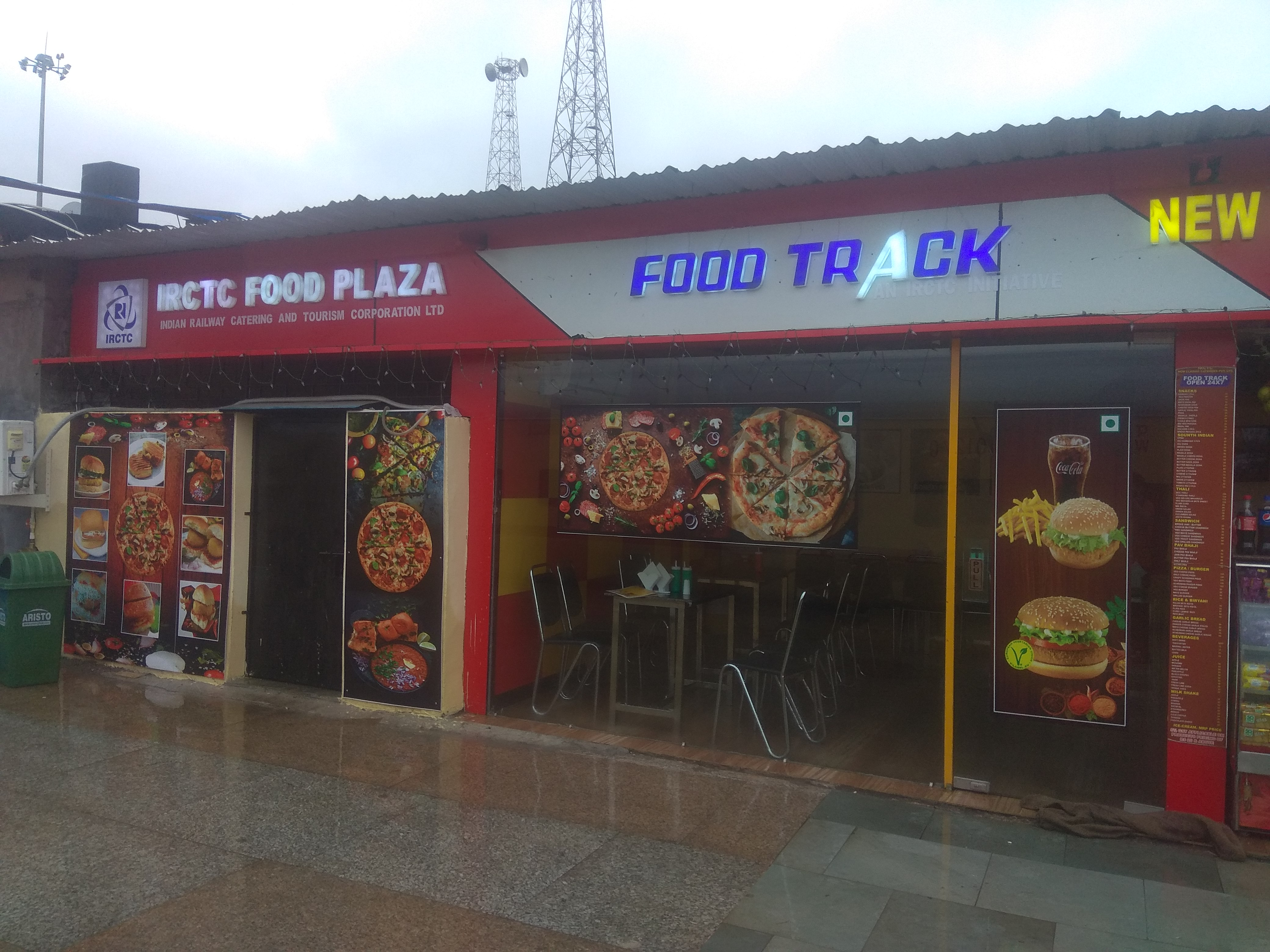
A food plaza run by IRCTC

=== Catering and hospitality ===
IRCTC has exclusive rights for onboard catering of food on all trains operated by the Indian Railways. Pantry cars are attached to long and medium distance trains, where food may be prepared onboard or pre-cooked meals can be served depending on the type of the train and the accommodation class. IRCTC also operates food plazas, cafeterias and refreshment rooms at various railway stations. In 2014, IRCTC launched e-catering services which allowed passengers to order food from private restaurants online and have it delivered to their seats. IRCTC also manages waiting lounges, retiring rooms and budget hotels at major railway stations. IRCTC launched the 'Rail Neer' bottled water in 2003, which is sold on trains and railway stations. During the 2025 Prayag Kumbh Mela, IRCTC offered tent accommodations to visitors.

=== Train operations ===
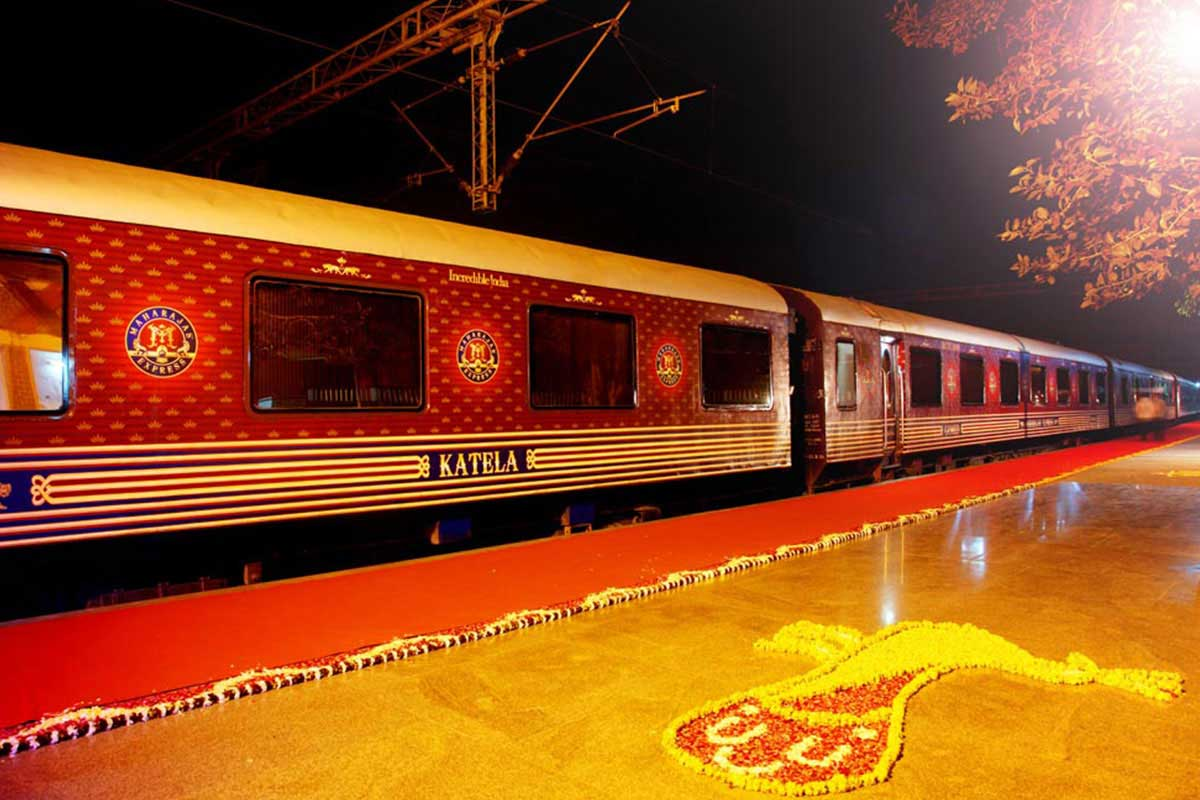
Maharajas' Express, a luxury train operated by IRCTC

IRCTC operates luxury trains such as Maharajas' Express, Deccan Odyssey, and other special tourist trains. These may include standard coaches, regular coaches with modifications and specially designed coaches with coupes, dedicated cabins and suites.

IRCTC also operates a few express trains in co-ordination with Indian Railways. In 2020, the IRCTC operated the first private train in India, the Lucknow–New Delhi Tejas Express. It later started operating Ahmedabad–Mumbai Central Tejas Express and Kashi Mahakal Express.

=== Travel and insurance ===
IRCTC also organises package tours for domestic and foreign tourists. It also serves as a travel agent and enables booking of various services including hotel, flight, taxi, and food delivery in co-ordination with third parties through the platform.

IRCTC offers travel insurance to passengers for a nominal fee in collaboration with a third-party insurer. In 2018, a security researcher reported that the travel insurance scheme, which redirected users of the IRCTC app to a third-party insurer, had left the personal information of approximately 200,000 passengers exposed over a period of two years. In response, IRCTC paused the scheme temporarily and fixed the vulnerability that had left this data exposed.

=== Others ===
In May 2020, the IRCTC developed the Aarogya Setu mobile app to help the government track COVID-19 cases. In May 2020, the app was made mandatory for train travel during the COVID-19 related restrictions. Following a directive from the Karnataka High Court in June 2020, the government clarified that downloading the app was optional and not mandatory for train travel.

As IRCTC enables various services in co-ordination with third parties, the user data is shared with various entities. In 2016, Maharashtra Police reported a potential leak of personal information relating to 10 million users registered with IRCTC. IRCTC set up a committee consisting of officials from the IRCTC and Centre for Railway Information Systems to examine the report and stated that data held by IRCTC was secure, while some data shared with third parties may have been leaked. In 2018, IRCTC announced that it is exploring on ways to increase revenues through the utilization of passenger data. This raised concerns on sharing and safety of passenger data stored with IRCTC. In October 2020, passenger data of more than 0.9 million individuals surfaced in dark web although IRCTC denied that its systems had been breached.

During the 2020–2021 Indian farmers' protests, IRCTC used the passenger email addresses provided during ticket bookings to send pamphlets promoting various government welfare schemes. It was alleged that these emails were specifically targeted at Sikhs from Punjab, although IRCTC officials denied the allegation.

== Patronage ==
IRCTC's e-ticketing platform has continued to see substantial growth since its introduction with e-ticketing accounting for 89% of all reserved bookings of the Indian Railways in FY 2025–26, up 54% a decade ago. As of August 2026, IRCTC has 70.6 million registered users, with a daily average of 1.56 million tickets booked. On 6 March 2025, it recorded its highest-ever single-day booking volume of 1.62 million tickets, while on 12 March 2025 it processed 30,155 bookings in a single minute. As of 2024-25, mobile platforms contributed 53.8% of all e-tickets, with the IRCTC's 'Rail Connect' mobile app reaching 146.3 million downloads.
