= Chennai Egmore–Madurai Tejas Express =

Train in India

Chennai Egmore – Madurai Junction Tejas Express
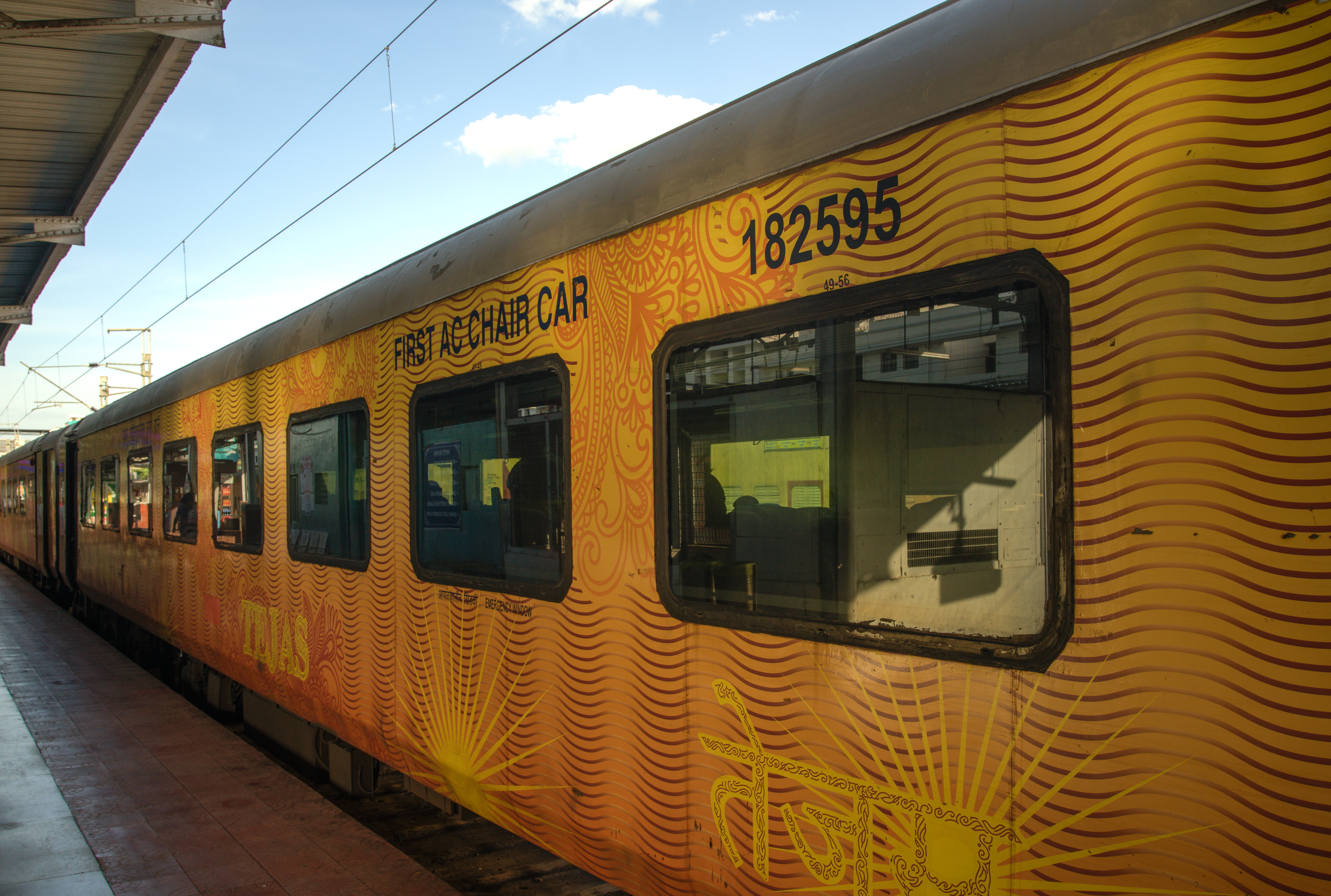
- Chennai Egmore - Madurai Tejas Express at Tiruchchirappalli Junction.

Overview
- Service type: Tejas Express
- Locale: Tamil Nadu
- First service: 1 March 2019; 7 years ago
- Current operator: Southern Railway

Route
- Termini: Chennai Egmore (MS); Madurai (MDU)
- Stops: 3
- Distance travelled: 493 km (306 mi)
- Average journey time: 6 hrs 15 mins
- Service frequency: 6 days a week
- Train number: 22671 / 22672

On-board services
- Classes: AC Chair Car, AC Executive Chair Car
- Seating arrangements: Yes
- Sleeping arrangements: No
- Auto-rack arrangements: Overhead racks
- Catering facilities: On-board catering, E-Catering
- Observation facilities: Large windows
- Entertainment facilities: Yes
- Baggage facilities: No
- Other facilities: Below the seats

Technical
- Rolling stock: LHB Tejas rake
- Track gauge: 1,676 mm (5 ft 6 in)
- Operating speed: 79.5 km/h (49 mph) average including halts.
- Rake maintenance: Chennai Egmore

The 22671 / 22672 Chennai Egmore–Madurai Tejas Express is India's second semi-high speed Tejas Express introduced by Indian Railways connecting Chennai Egmore and Madurai Junction in Tamil Nadu, after Mumbai CSMT–Karmali Tejas Express.

== Background ==
It is currently being operated with 22671/22672 train numbers on six days a week basis. At present, it is the only Tejas Express running in Tamil Nadu as well as in Entire South India and the currently fastest Tejas Express.

== Service ==
22671/22672 Chennai Egmore–Madurai Junction Tejas Express currently operates 6 days a week, covering 493 km in 6 hrs 12 mins (79.5 km/h average speed). Max speed is 110 km/h.

== Traction ==
even route was fully electrified both electric and diesel haul em end to end WAP-7 and WDM-3D pulls this for entire journey

== See also ==
- Vande Bharat Express
- Humsafar Express
- Antyodaya Express
- Tejas Express
- Uday Express
