= Lucknow–New Delhi Tejas Express =

Tejas Express train operating by IRCTC, India

Lucknow Junction – New Delhi Tejas Express
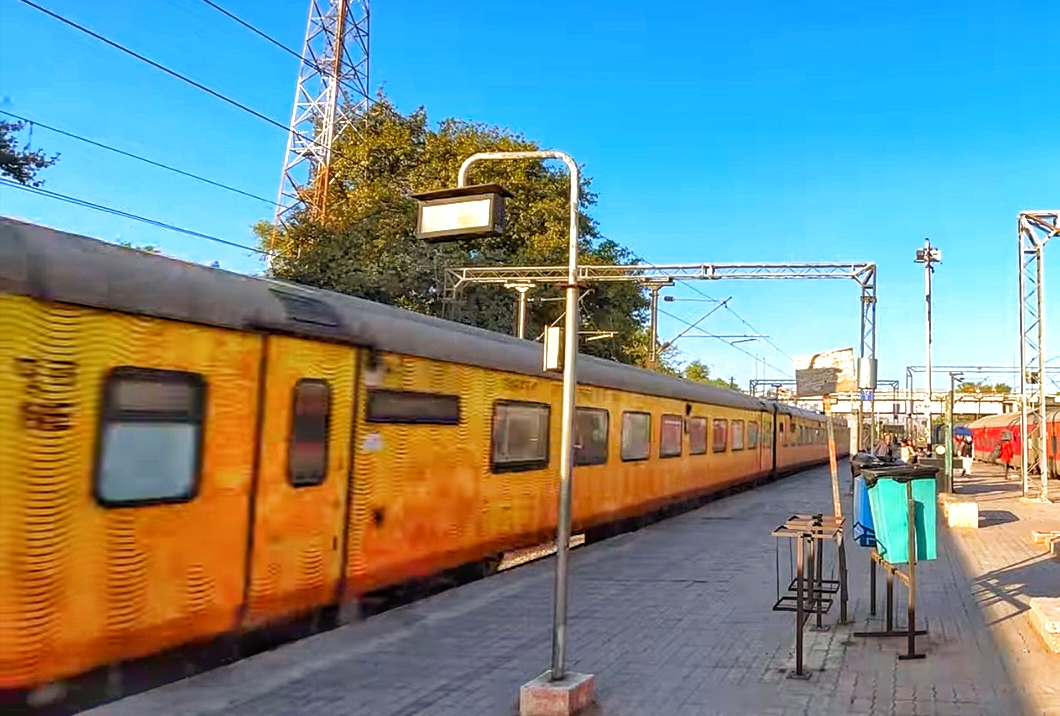
- Lucknow Junction – New Delhi Tejas Express at Unnao Junction

Overview
- Service type: Tejas Express
- Locale: Uttar Pradesh & Delhi
- First service: 4 October 2019; 7 years ago
- Current operators: IRCTC & Indian Railways

Route
- Termini: Lucknow Junction (LJN); New Delhi (NDLS)
- Stops: 2
- Distance travelled: 512 km (318 mi)
- Average journey time: 6 hrs 15 mins
- Service frequency: 6 days a week
- Train number: 82501 / 82502

On-board services
- Classes: AC Executive Class, AC chair car
- Seating arrangements: Yes
- Sleeping arrangements: No
- Auto-rack arrangements: Overhead racks
- Catering facilities: No pantry car attached but on-board catering available
- Observation facilities: Large windows
- Entertainment facilities: Yes
- Baggage facilities: Below the seats

Technical
- Rolling stock: LHB Tejas rake
- Track gauge: 1,676 mm (5 ft 6 in)
- Operating speed: 79 km/h (49 mph) average including halts

The 82501 / 82502 Lucknow–New Delhi Tejas Express is one of India's semi-high speed full AC Tejas Express fleet introduced by Indian Railways connecting New Delhi in Delhi and Lucknow Junction in Uttar Pradesh. The train started its operations on 4 October 2019, on the occasion of Navaratris. It is the fastest train between Lucknow and Delhi and vice versa after the introduction of Anand Vihar Terminal-Ayodhya Cantonment Vande Bharat Express.

== History ==
The train is India's first privately operated train, operated by IRCTC.

In August 2026, it became India's first privately branded passenger train under a new brand deal rights for six months by the soft drink brand Sprite. Subsequently the train will be renamed as Sprite Tejas Express.

== Service ==
The train leaves Lucknow Junction at 06:10 am and reaches New Delhi at 12:35 pm. On its return journey, it leaves Delhi at 3:30 pm and reach Lucknow at 10:05 pm. The train, having three stops at Kanpur Central,Tundla Junction and Ghaziabad, runs on all days of the week, except Tuesday.

== Other facilities ==
IRCTC, the operator of this train, announced that in Indian rail history for the first time ever, passengers will be compensated for delays. ₹100 will be paid to passengers if the delay is over one hour, and ₹250 will be paid for delays over two hours.

Alongside a slew of offers like free travel insurance worth ₹25 lakh (US$26,000) and on-board infotainment services, doorstep baggage collection and local food are provided, but no Tatkal quota will be available for this train.

== Profitability ==
The train, in its first month of run, with an average occupancy of 80–85%, made a profit of ₹70 lakh (US$73,000), while earning a revenue of nearly ₹3.70 crore (US$380,000) through ticket sale.s IRCTC, the public operator, spent an average of nearly ₹14 lakh per day to run the train, and earned around ₹17.50 lakh daily from passenger fares.

== Traction ==
as the route fully electrified WDM-3A and WAP-5 so was WAP-4 hauled end to end
