= Kashi Mahakal Express (via Prayagraj) =

Train in India

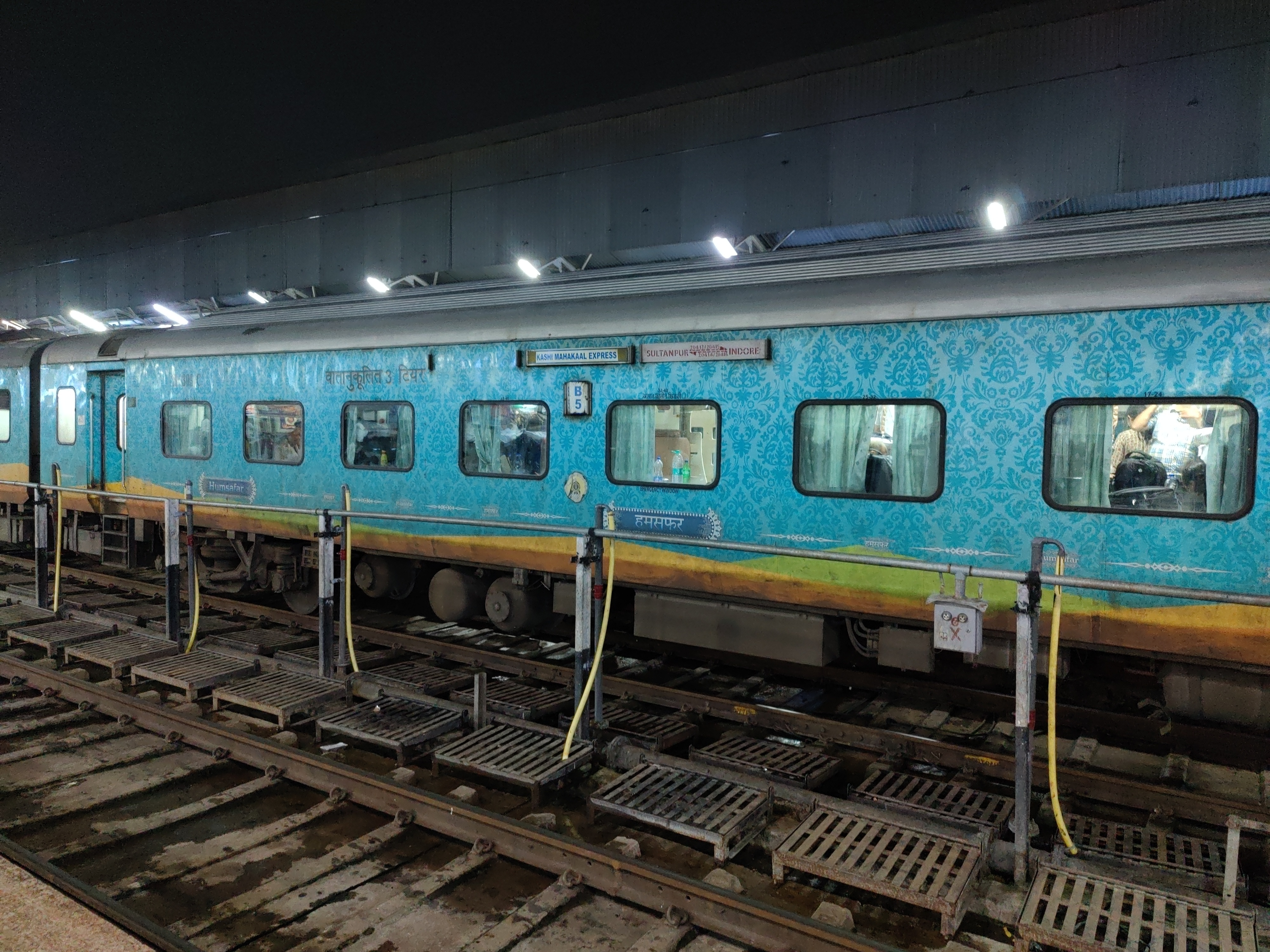
- Kashi Mahakal Express at Platform 2 of Kanpur Central.

Overview
- Service type: Superfast
- First service: 23 February 2020; 5 years ago
- Current operator: Northern Railways

Route
- Termini: Varanasi Junction (BSB); Indore Junction (INDB)
- Stops: 6
- Distance travelled: 1,102 km (685 mi)
- Average journey time: 18 hours 25 mins
- Service frequency: Weekly
- Train number: 20415 / 20416

On-board services
- Class(es): AC 3 tier
- Seating arrangements: No
- Sleeping arrangements: Yes
- Catering facilities: Yes
- Observation facilities: Large windows
- Entertainment facilities: Yes (in executive class)
- Baggage facilities: Yes

Technical
- Rolling stock: LHB coach
- Track gauge: 1,676 mm (5 ft 6 in)
- Operating speed: 60 km/h (37 mph) average including halts

The 20415 / 20416 Kashi Mahakal Express is a superfast express train of the Indian Railways connecting Varanasi Junction in Uttar Pradesh and Indore Junction in Madhya Pradesh via Prayagraj Junction. It is currently being operated with 20415/20416 train numbers weekly. This train shares its rake with Kashi Mahakal Express (via Lucknow).

== Coach composition ==
The trains is completely 3-tier AC sleeper trains designed by Indian Railways with features of LED screen display to show information about stations, train speed etc. and will have announcement system as well, Vending machines for tea, coffee and milk, Bio toilets in compartments as well as CCTV cameras.

== Service ==
It averages 60 km/h as 20415 Humsafar Express covering 1102 km in 18 hrs 25 mins & 61 km/h as 20416 Humsafar Express covering 1102 km in 18 hrs 5 mins.

== Schedule ==
Train Number	Station Code	Departure Station	Departure Time	Departure Day	Arrival Station	Arrival Time	Arrival Day
20415	BSB	Varanasi	3:15 PM	SUN	Indore	9:40 AM	MON
20416	INDB	Indore	10:55 AM	MON	Varanasi	5:00 AM	TUES

== Locomotive ==
Both trains hauls by a Ghaziabad (GZB) / Vadodara (BRC) Electric Loco Shed based WAP 7 locomotive from end to end.

== Stoppage ==
- Varanasi Junction
- Prayagraj Junction
- Kanpur Central
- Jhansi Junction
- Bina Junction
- Sant Hirdaram Nagar
- Ujjain Junction
- Indore Junction

== See also ==
- Humsafar Express
- Varanasi Junction
- Indore Junction
- Kashi Mahakal Express (via Lucknow)
