= Durgapuri metro station =

Lucknow Metro's Red Line metro station

Durgapuri
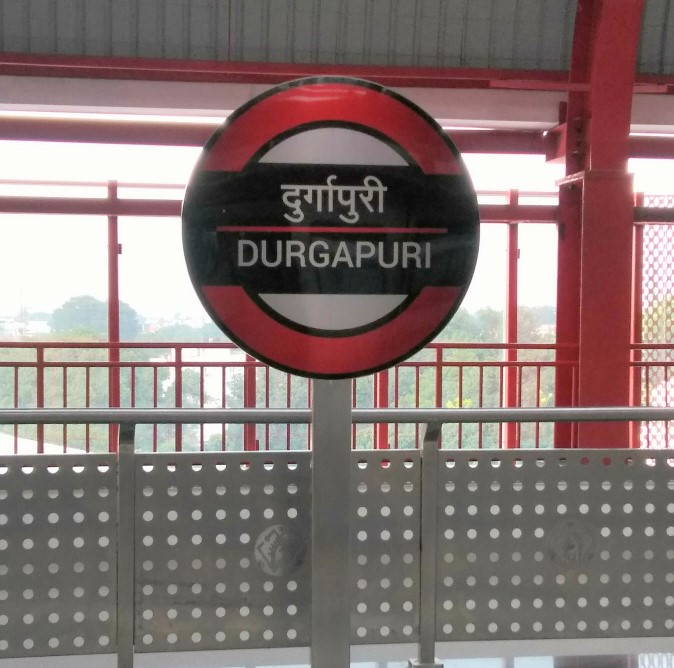

General information
- Location: Blunt Square, Cash and Pay Colony, Charbagh, Lucknow, Uttar Pradesh 226004
- Coordinates: 26.831960°N 80.915431°E
- System: Lucknow Metro station
- Owner: Lucknow Metro
- Operator: Uttar Pradesh Metro Rail Corporation
- Line: Red Line
- Platforms: Side platform Platform-1 → Munshi Pulia; Platform-2 → CCS International Airport
- Tracks: 2
- Connections: Lucknow Junction

Construction
- Structure type: Elevated, Double track
- Platform levels: 2
- Accessible: Yes
- Architectural style: Lucknow Metro

Other information
- Status: Staffed

History
- Opened: 6 September 2017; 9 years ago
- Electrified: Single-phase 25 kV 50 Hz AC through overhead catenary

Services
Preceding station	Lucknow Metro	Following station
Mawaiya towards CCS International Airport	Red Line	Charbagh towards Munshi Pulia
Route map
Location

Durgapuri is an elevated metro station on the North-South Corridor of the Red Line of Lucknow Metro in the city of Lucknow, Uttar Pradesh, India.

== Station layout ==
G	Street level	Exit/Entrance
L1	Mezzanine	Fare control, station agent, Metro Card vending machines, crossover
L2	Side platform | Doors will open on the left
L2	Platform 2 Southbound	Towards → CCS International Airport; Next Station: Mawaiya
L2	Platform 1 Northbound	Towards ← Munshi Pulia; Next Station: Charbagh
L2	Side platform | Doors will open on the left
L2

== Structure ==
Durgapuri metro station

General information
- Status: Completed
- Type: Railway station
- Location: Charbagh, Lucknow, Lucknow, India
- Coordinates: 26°49′55″N 80°54′56″E
- Elevation: 122 m (400 ft)
- Construction started: 2014
- Completed: 2017
- Opened: 6 September 2017
- Inaugurated: 5 September 2017

Technical details
- Floor count: 2
- Lifts/elevators: 4

Design and construction
- Main contractor: Larsen & Toubro

Website
- www.lmrcl.com

== Connections ==
- Lucknow Junction railway station

Lucknow City Transport Services Ltd bus routes number 11, 11A, 11D, 11E, 11G, 12, 13, 15, 23, 23A, 23B, 23T, 24A, 24B, 25, 25A, 31, 31A, 33, 33B, 33C, 33M, 33PGI, 33S, 33SAKHI, 34, 34IT, 35A, 35I, 35LU, 44B, 44D, 45, 65T, 65V, 66, 66A, 66LU, 68, 69 serves the station from nearby Charbagh bus stand.

== See also ==
- Lucknow
- List of Lucknow Metro stations
- Uttar Pradesh State Road Transport Corporation
- Rapid Transit in India
- List of metro systems
