= Kashi Mahakal Express (via Lucknow) =

Train in India

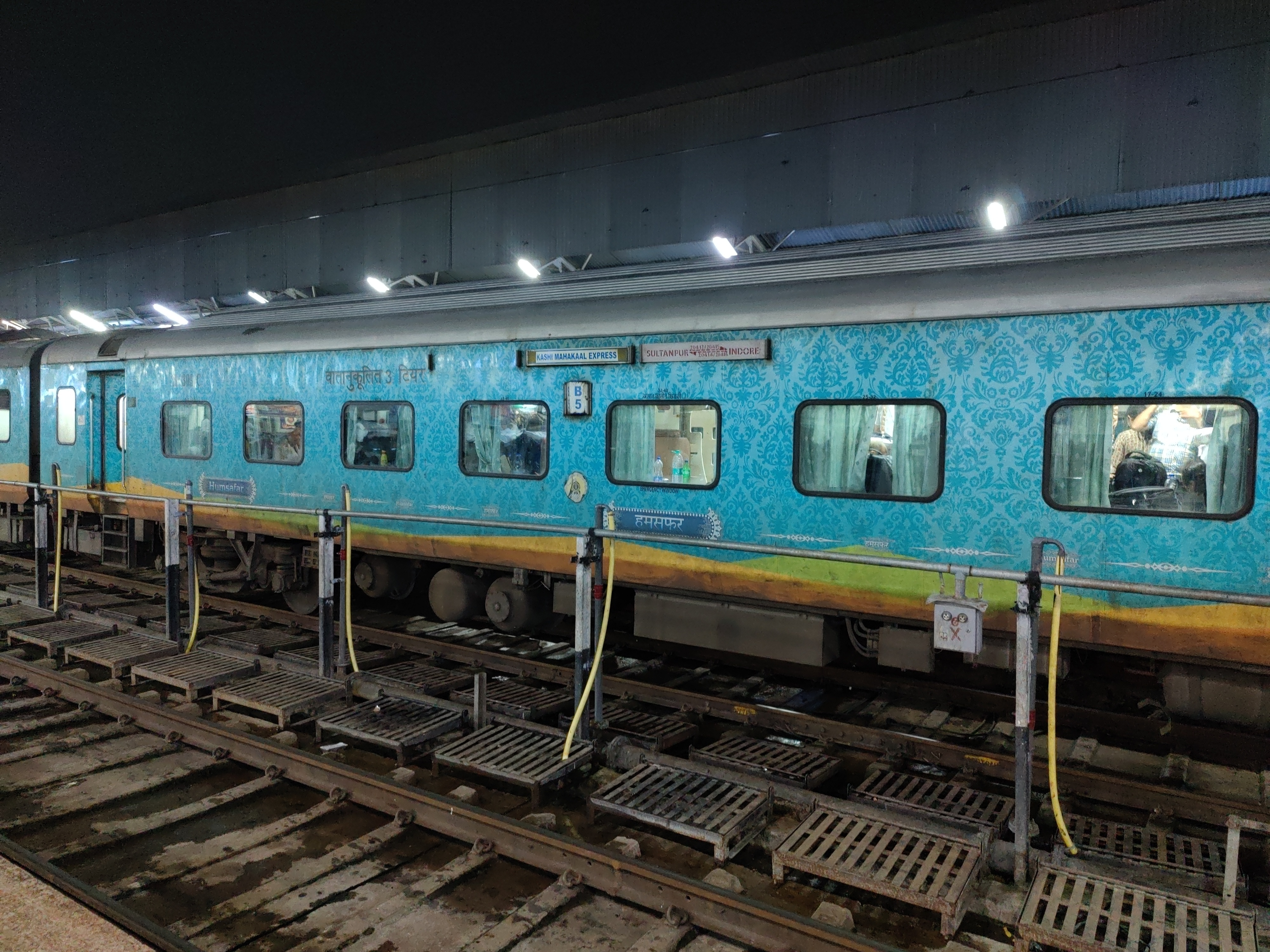
- Kashi Mahakal Express at Platform 2 of Kanpur Central.

Overview
- Service type: Superfast
- First service: 20 February 2020; 5 years ago
- Current operator: Indian Railways

Route
- Termini: Varanasi Junction (BSB); Indore Junction (INDB)
- Stops: 7
- Distance travelled: 1,128 km (701 mi)
- Average journey time: 18 hours 55 mins
- Service frequency: Tri-weekly
- Train number: 20413 / 20414

On-board services
- Class(es): AC 3 tier
- Seating arrangements: No
- Sleeping arrangements: Yes
- Catering facilities: Available
- Observation facilities: Large windows
- Entertainment facilities: Yes (in executive class)
- Baggage facilities: Yes

Technical
- Rolling stock: LHB Humsafar
- Track gauge: 1,676 mm (5 ft 6 in)
- Operating speed: 60 km/h (37 mph) average including halts

The 20413 / 20414 Kashi Mahakal Express is a superfast express train of the Indian Railways connecting Varanasi Junction in Uttar Pradesh and Indore Junction in Madhya Pradesh via Lucknow. It is currently being operated with 20413/20414 (via Lucknow) twice a week and 20415/20416 (via Prayagraj) once a week. This train share rake with Mahakal Superfast Express (Via Prayagraj).

== Coach composition ==
The train has 3-tier AC and sleeper coach trains designed by Indian Railways it has 3 sleeper coach and more than 7 third ac coach and 1 second ac one pantry car also.

== Service ==
It averages 60 km/h as 20413 Humsafar Express covering 1110 km in 18 hrs 45 mins & 59 km/h as 20414 Humsafar Express covering 1110 km in 18 hrs 20 mins.

== Schedule ==
Train Number	Station Code	Departure Station	Departure Time	Departure Day	Arrival Station	Arrival Time	Arrival Day
20413	BSB	Varanasi	2:45 PM	TUES THU	Indore	9:40 AM	WED FRI
20414	INDB	Indore	10:55 AM	WED FRI	Varanasi	6:00 AM	THU SAT

== Locomotive ==
This train is hauled by a Ghaziabad (GZB) / Vadodara (BRC) loco shed based WAP 7 locomotive on its entire journey.

== Stoppage ==
- Varanasi Junction
- Sultanpur Junction
- Lucknow Charbagh
- Kanpur Central
- Jhansi Junction
- Bina Junction
- Sant Hirdaram Nagar
- Ujjain Junction
- Indore Junction

== See also ==
- Humsafar Express
- Varanasi Junction
- Indore Junction
- IRCTC Kashi Mahakal Humsafar Express (Via Allahabad)
