= Lucknow City railway station =

Indian railway station

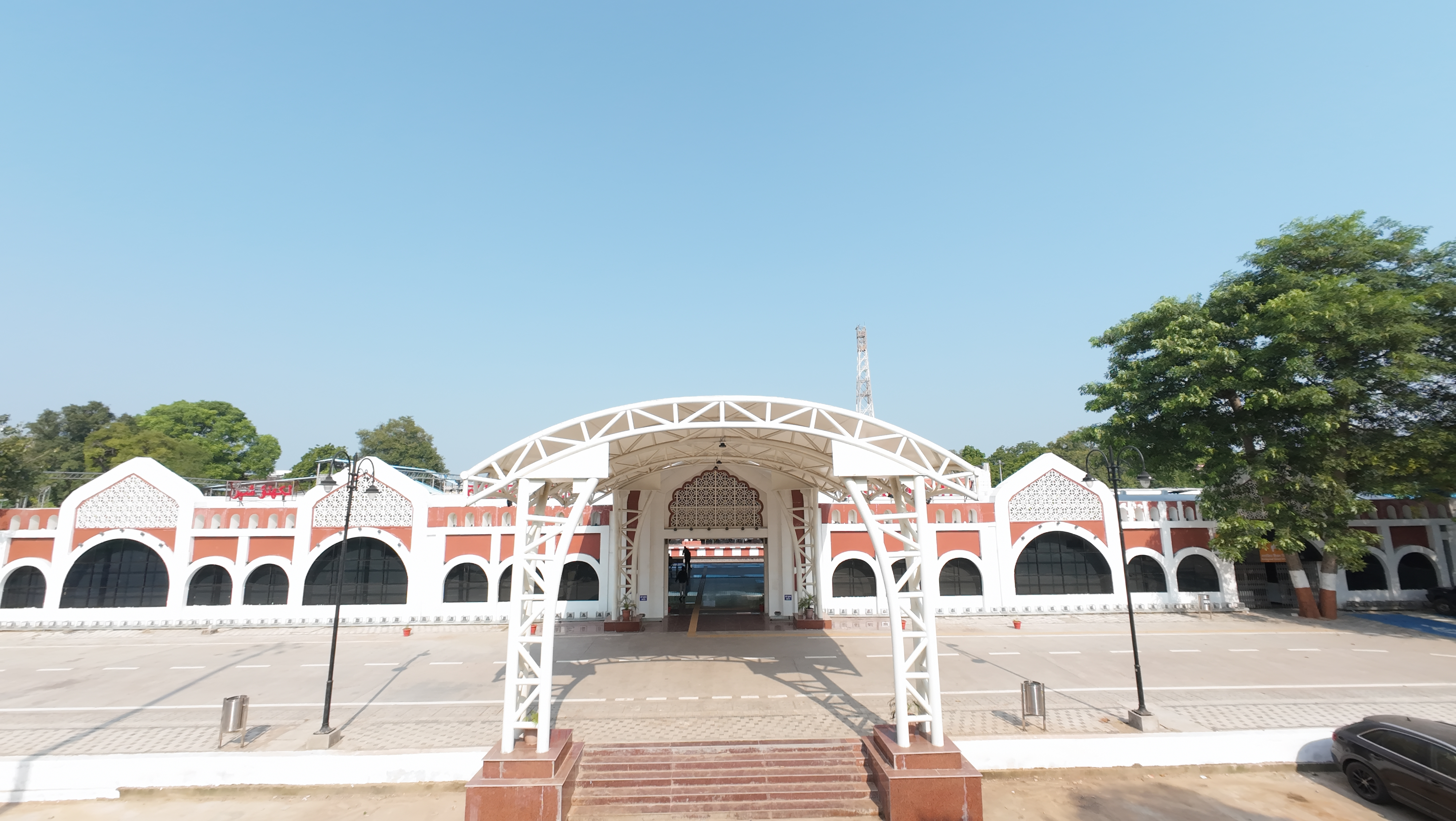

General information
- Location: Jawahar Nagar, Wazirganj, Lucknow, Uttar Pradesh; India
- Coordinates: 26.8528863°N 80.904897°E
- Elevation: 126 metres (413 ft)
- System: Indian Railways station
- Owner: Indian Railways
- Operator: North Eastern Railway
- Line: Lucknow–Sitapur–Lakhimpur–Pilibhit–Bareilly–Kasganj line
- Platforms: 3
- Tracks: 4
- Connections: Auto stand

Construction
- Structure type: Standard (on ground station)
- Parking: Yes
- Cycle facilities: Yes

Other information
- Status: Functioning
- Station code: LC
- Zone(s): North Eastern Railway
- Division(s): Lucknow NER

Services
Location

Lucknow City railway station (station code: LC) is a railway station in Lucknow, Uttar Pradesh, India. It is an important station under the North Eastern Railway zone of Indian Railways and is administered by the Lucknow NER railway division. The station is classified as a Non-Suburban Grade-5 (NSG-5) railway station and handles over 1,600 passengers daily. It serves the northern and eastern parts of Lucknow and provides rail connectivity to several destinations across Uttar Pradesh and neighbouring states.

== History ==
Lucknow City railway station was established in the late 19th century as part of the metre-gauge railway network developed by the Rohilkhand and Kumaon Railway. The Lucknow–Sitapur section was opened for traffic on 15 November 1886, making the station an important part of the early railway network in the Awadh region.

On 31 October 1925, a double line between Lucknow City and Aishbagh was commissioned to increase operational capacity and improve train movements. Over the years, the station has continued to serve as an important regional railway station under the North Eastern Railway zone.

In 2025, Lucknow City railway station became North India's first all-women staffed railway station, with women employees managing station operations, passenger services, ticketing, security, and other operational functions.

== Women-led station initiative ==
In October 2025, Lucknow City railway station became North India's first fully women-staffed railway station under an initiative launched by the Lucknow NER railway division of the North Eastern Railway zone. The initiative was inaugurated by Mr. Gaurav Agarwal, Divisional Railway Manager (DRM), Lucknow Division, as part of Indian Railways' Nari Shakti (Women Power) initiative.

The station is operated round the clock by a team of 34 women employees, who manage all major operational and passenger service functions. The all-women workforce is headed by the Station Superintendent and includes personnel responsible for station operations, ticketing, reservation, signalling, train operations, commercial activities, security, and passenger assistance.

Women employees manage the booking and reservation counters, luggage services, signalling and point operations, train communication systems, and station control functions. Security is provided by women personnel of the Railway Protection Force, while housekeeping and sanitation services are also managed by women staff, making Lucknow City one of the few railway stations in India to be entirely operated by women employees.

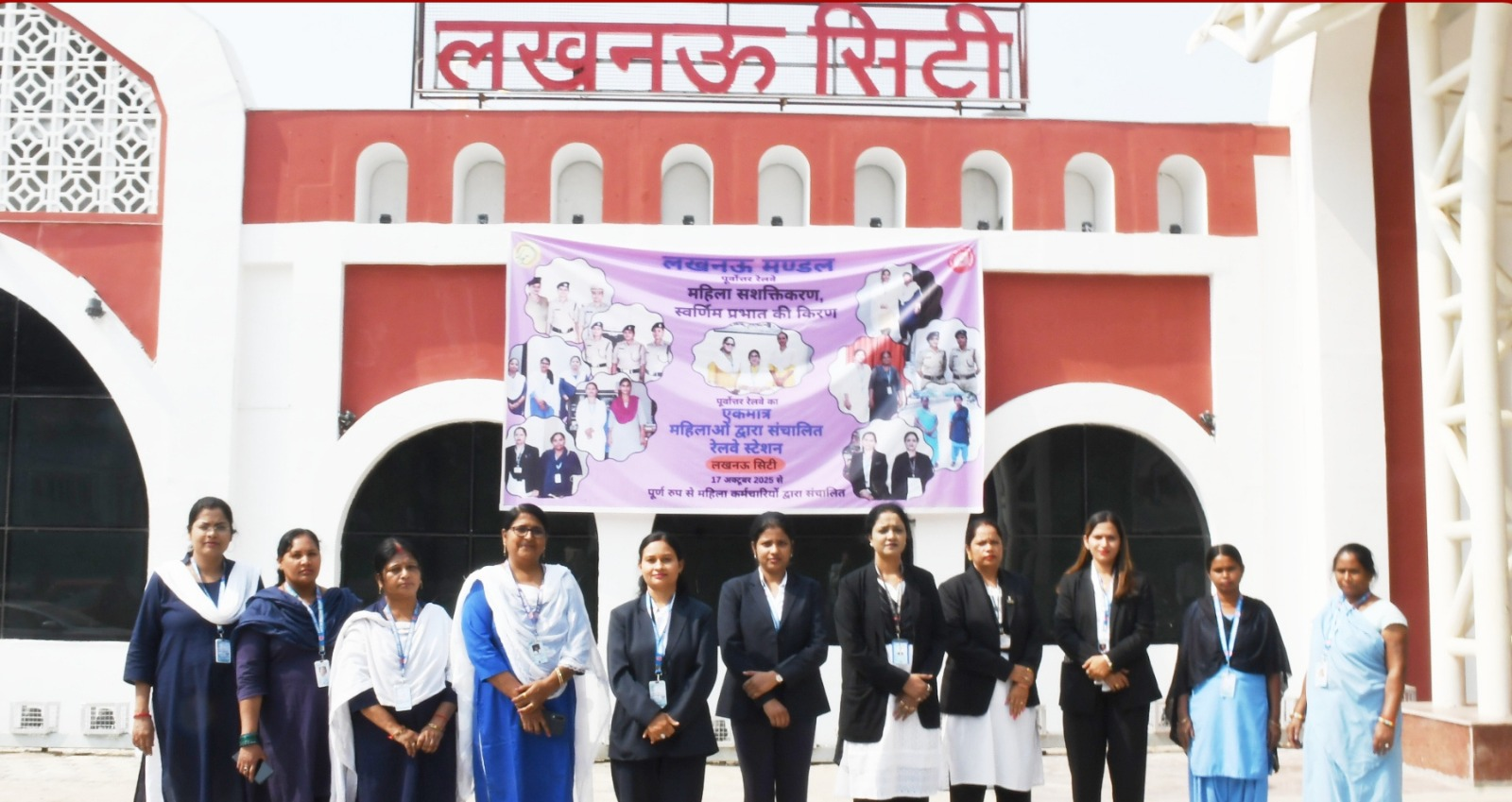
Women employees at Lucknow City railway station

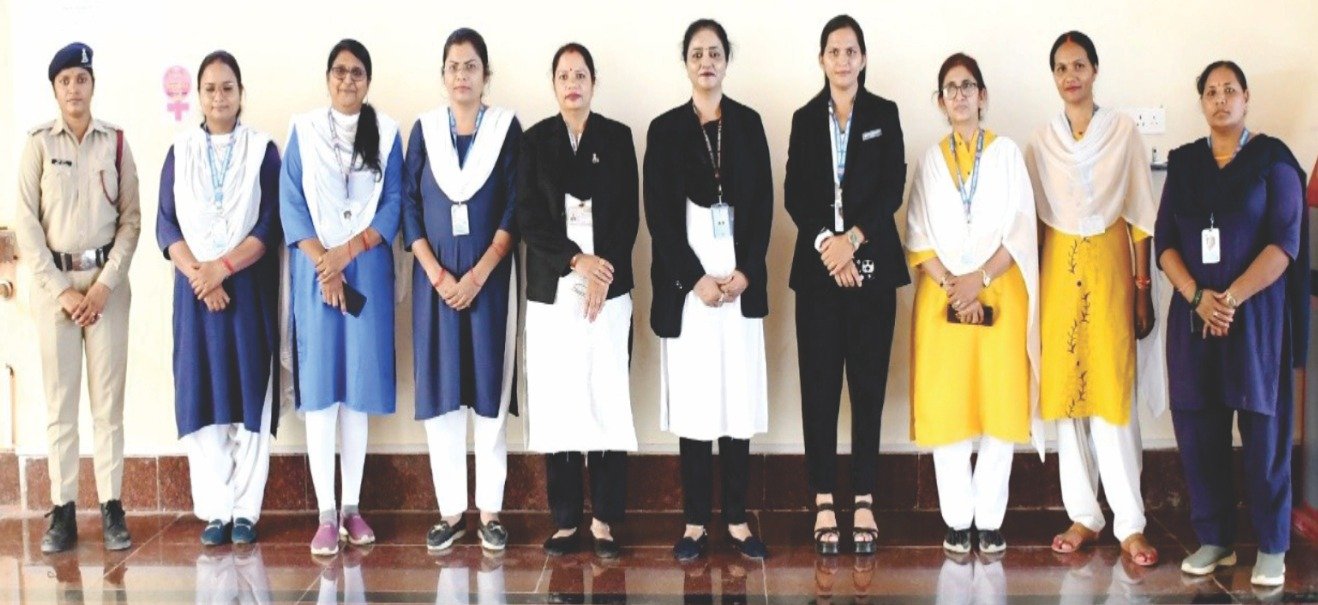
Women-led operations at Lucknow City railway station

== Redevelopment ==
Lucknow City railway station is being redeveloped under the Amrit Bharat Station Scheme, a nationwide initiative of Indian Railways aimed at improving station infrastructure, passenger amenities, accessibility, and multimodal connectivity.

The North Eastern Railway zone has sanctioned a redevelopment project worth approximately ₹8 crore for the station. The project includes improvements to passenger facilities, station buildings, circulating areas, lighting, signage, accessibility features, and other supporting infrastructure to enhance the overall travel experience.

The redevelopment of Lucknow City railway station forms part of a broader modernization programme covering several railway stations in Lucknow. The initiative is intended to improve operational efficiency, reduce congestion at major terminals, and strengthen the city's railway infrastructure.
