= Lucknow Junction railway station =

Indian railway station

Lucknow Junction North Eastern Railway
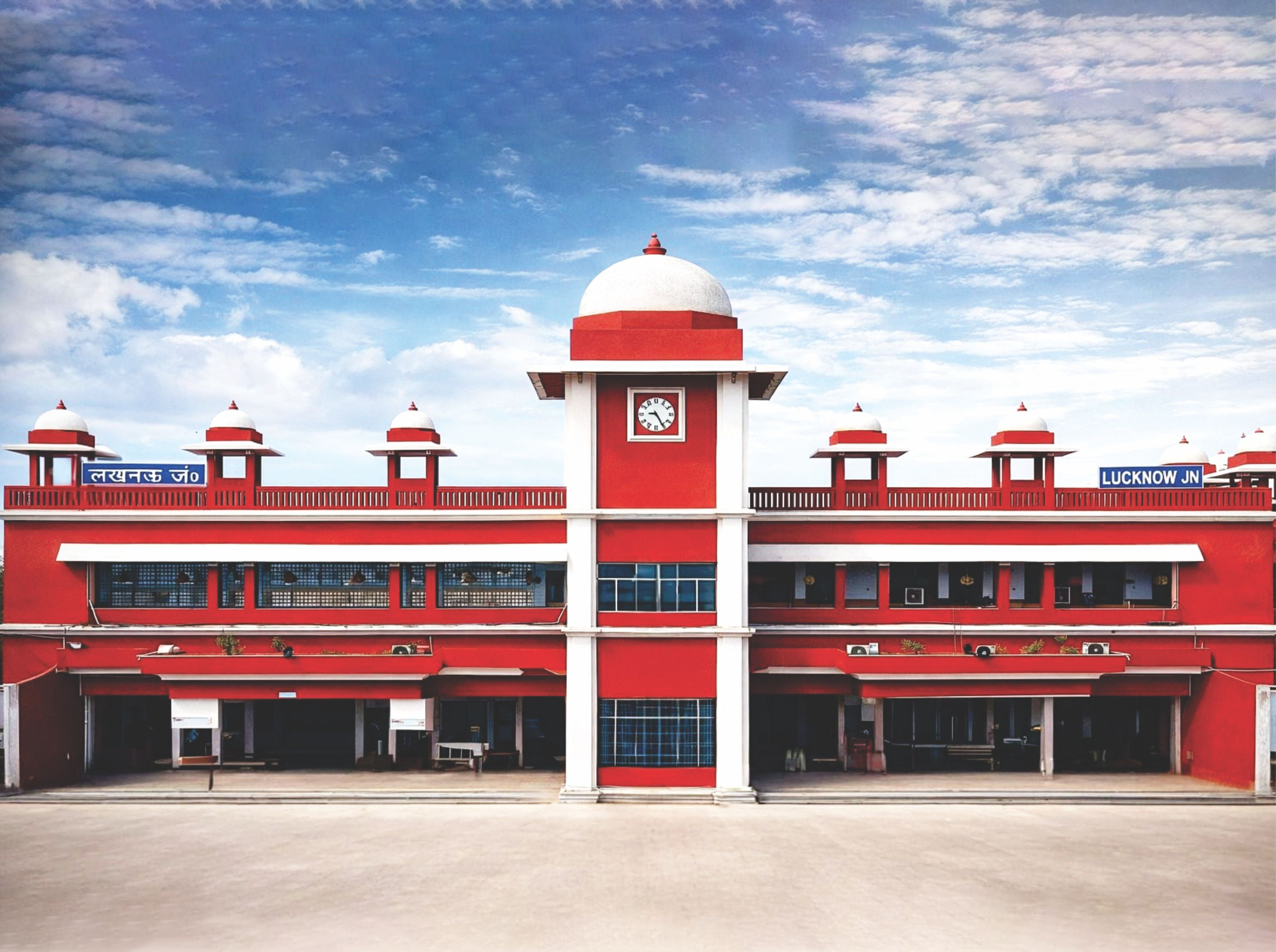

General information
- Location: Charbagh, Lucknow, Uttar Pradesh 226004; India
- Elevation: 126 metres (413 ft)
- System: Regional rail and Light rail
- Owner: Ministry of Railways (India)
- Operator: Indian Railways
- Platforms: 6
- Tracks: 8
- Connections: Red Line Durgapuri Metro

Construction
- Structure type: at grade
- Parking: Yes
- Cycle facilities: Available
- Accessible: Disabled access

Other information
- Status: Active
- Station code: LJN
- Zone(s): North Eastern Railway
- Division(s): Lucknow NER

History
- Opened: 15 Feb 1926
- Former names: Oudh and Rohilkhand Railway / East Indian Railway Company

Passengers
- 50,000/Day

Services
Location

Lucknow Junction (Station code: LJN) is a railway station in the Charbagh area of Lucknow, Uttar Pradesh, India. It serves as an important rail hub under the North Eastern Railway of Indian Railways and falls under the administrative jurisdiction of the Lucknow NER railway division. The station is categorized as a Non-Suburban Grade-2 (NSG-2) railway station.

Lucknow Junction is one of the major railway stations of Lucknow and an important revenue-generating station of North Eastern Railway. The station handles more than 50,000 passengers daily and operates various Mail/Express and passenger services connecting Lucknow with several destinations across India.

== History ==
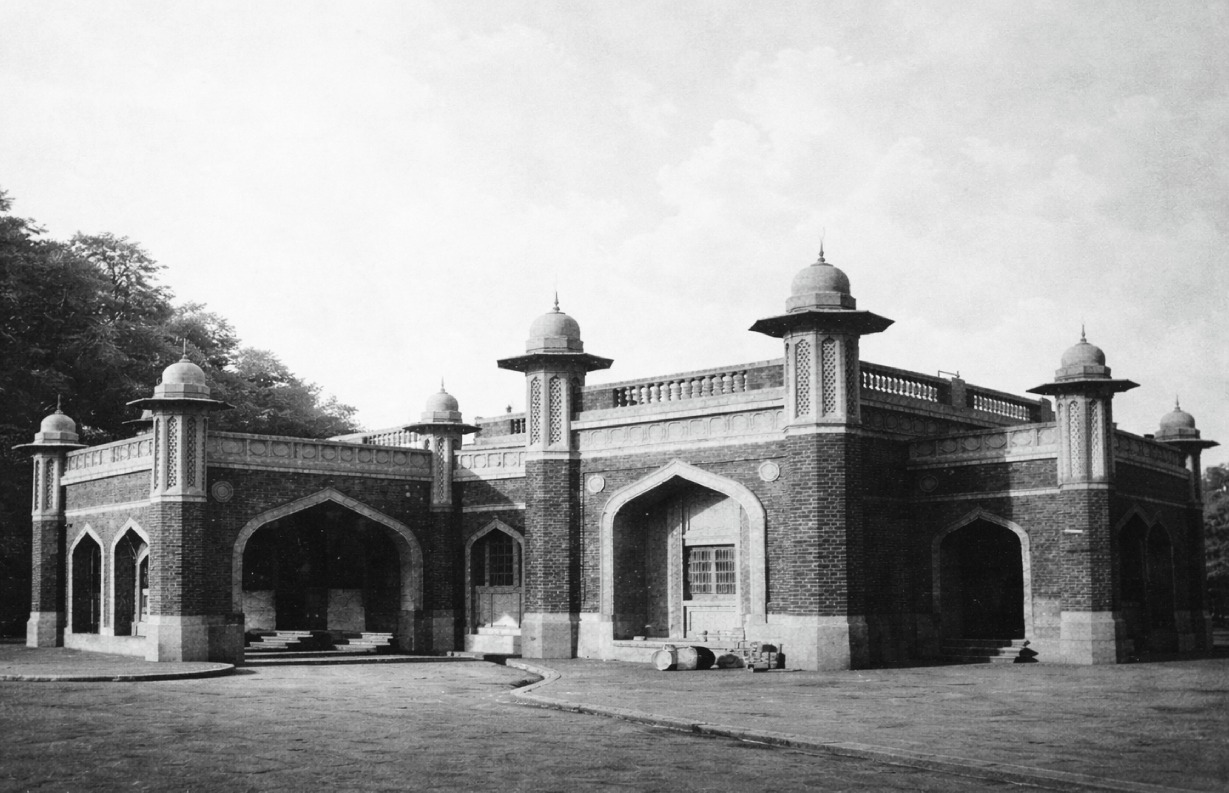

Lucknow Junction railway station was established in the early 20th century during the expansion of the metre-gauge railway network in northern India. The station originally served metre-gauge routes operated by the erstwhile Oudh and Rohilkhand Railway and later became part of the North Eastern Railway zone network.

The station, popularly known as "Chhoti Line", historically functioned as a major terminal for metre-gauge services connecting Lucknow with eastern and northern regions of Uttar Pradesh. Over time, it emerged as an important centre for regional and passenger rail operations under the North Eastern Railway.

Lucknow Junction completed 100 years of service in February 2026. During its centenary celebrations, the station's historical role in the development of Lucknow's railway network and its association with the steam-era metre-gauge system were highlighted.

Following the conversion of all metre-gauge routes to broad gauge, Lucknow Junction developed into one of the principal railway terminals of Lucknow, serving both long-distance and suburban rail services.

== Former Divisional Railway Managers ==
The following officers have served as the Divisional Railway Manager (DRM) of the Lucknow NER railway division:

| S. No. | Name | From | To |
|---|---|---|---|
| 1 | Gaurav Agarwal | 14 February 2025 | Present |
| 2 | Aditya Kumar | 12 October 2022 | 14 February 2025 |
| 3 | Dr. Monica Agnihotri | 20 November 2019 | 12 October 2022 |
| 4 | Vijaylaxmi Kaushik | 9 October 2017 | 20 November 2019 |
| 5 | Alok Singh | 16 July 2015 | 9 October 2017 |
| 6 | Anup Kumar | 2 August 2013 | 16 July 2015 |
| 7 | Vinod Kumar Yadav | 25 April 2011 | 2 August 2013 |
| 8 | Ashok Kumar Singh | 6 April 2009 | 25 April 2011 |
| 9 | Ashima Singh | 14 February 2007 | 6 April 2009 |
| 10 | Amitabh Lal | 12 July 2005 | 14 February 2007 |
| 11 | K. K. Srivastava | 9 February 2004 | 12 July 2005 |
| 12 | V. K. Dutt | 16 May 2001 | 9 February 2004 |
| 13 | V. K. Jaiswal | 8 December 1998 | 15 May 2001 |
| 14 | R. C. Sharma | 12 June 1996 | 7 December 1998 |
| 15 | Kali Shanker | 29 May 1996 | 11 June 1996 |
| 16 | Raj Kumar | 19 July 1995 | 28 May 1996 |
| 17 | Aslam Mahmud | 17 May 1992 | 19 July 1995 |
| 18 | Shushma Pandey | 2 March 1992 | 16 May 1992 |
| 19 | Hari Mohan | 30 December 1991 | 1 March 1992 |
| 20 | A. K. Das | 6 December 1991 | 30 December 1991 |
| 21 | K. P. Singh | 13 September 1989 | 30 November 1991 |
| 22 | Vimal Dev Chaddha | 27 March 1989 | 12 September 1989 |
| 23 | Anirudh Mittal | 23 September 1985 | 27 March 1989 |
| 24 | Naubat Lal | 19 March 1984 | 22 September 1985 |
| 25 | R. S. Jain | 14 September 1983 | 18 March 1984 |
| 26 | A. Rama Rao | 14 July 1982 | 13 September 1983 |
| 27 | Mohan Bhargava | 15 October 1981 | 17 March 1982 |
| 28 | M. L. Bhaskar | 14 November 1977 | 14 October 1981 |
| 29 | Sudesh Pal Jain | 20 October 1977 | 13 November 1977 |
| 30 | Chandra Mauli Mani | 13 April 1976 | 19 October 1977 |
| 31 | Ramesh Chandra Sethi | 4 February 1976 | 12 April 1976 |
| 32 | Surendra Mohan Bammi | 29 March 1974 | 3 February 1976 |
| 33 | Vijay Kumar Pal Chaubey | 12 March 1974 | 28 March 1974 |
| 34 | Shyam Narayan Srivastava | 20 January 1974 | 11 March 1974 |
| 35 | Krishna Dev Madaan | 10 January 1973 | 19 January 1974 |
| 36 | Madan Lal Gupta | 1 May 1969 | 9 January 1973 |

== Train operations ==
Lucknow Junction handles originating/terminating trains only.

The following trains operation from Lucknow Junction:

| Sr. | Train No. | Train name |
|---|---|---|
| 1 | 11110/11109 | Lucknow–Jhansi Intercity Express |
| 2 | 11408/11407 | Lucknow–Pune Express |
| 3 | 12003/12004 | Lucknow Swarna Shatabdi Express |
| 4 | 12104/12103 | Lucknow–Pune Express |
| 5 | 12179/12180 | Lucknow–Agra Fort Intercity Express |
| 6 | 15033/15034 | Lucknow Junction–Patliputra Superfast Express |
| 7 | 15031/15032 | Lucknow Junction–Gorakhpur Intercity Express |
| 8 | 12535/12536 | Lucknow Jn.–Raipur Garib Rath Express |
| 9 | 12583/12584 | Lucknow Jn.–Anand Vihar Double Decker Express |
| 10 | 12593/12594 | Lucknow Jn.–Bhopal Garib Rath Express |
| 11 | 15008/15007 | Lucknow Jn.–Varanasi City Krishak Express |
| 12 | 15011/15012 | Lucknow Jn.–Saharanpur Express |
| 13 | 15043/15044 | Lucknow Jn.–Kathgodam Express |
| 14 | 15204/15203 | Lucknow–Barauni Express |
| 15 | 15205/15206 | Lucknow–Jabalpur Chitrakoot Express |
| 16 | 16094/16093 | Lucknow Jn.–MGR Chennai Central Express |
| 17 | 20922/20921 | Lucknow Jn.–Bandra Terminus Superfast Express |
| 18 | 22453/22454 | Lucknow–Meerut City Rajya Rani Express |
| 19 | 22545/22546 | Lucknow–Dehradun Vande Bharat Express |
| 20 | 55345/55346 | Lucknow Jn.–Kasganj Special Express |
| 21 | 82501/82502 | Lucknow–New Delhi Tejas Express |

Note: Rows highlighted in light blue indicate premium train services.

== Centenary celebrations ==
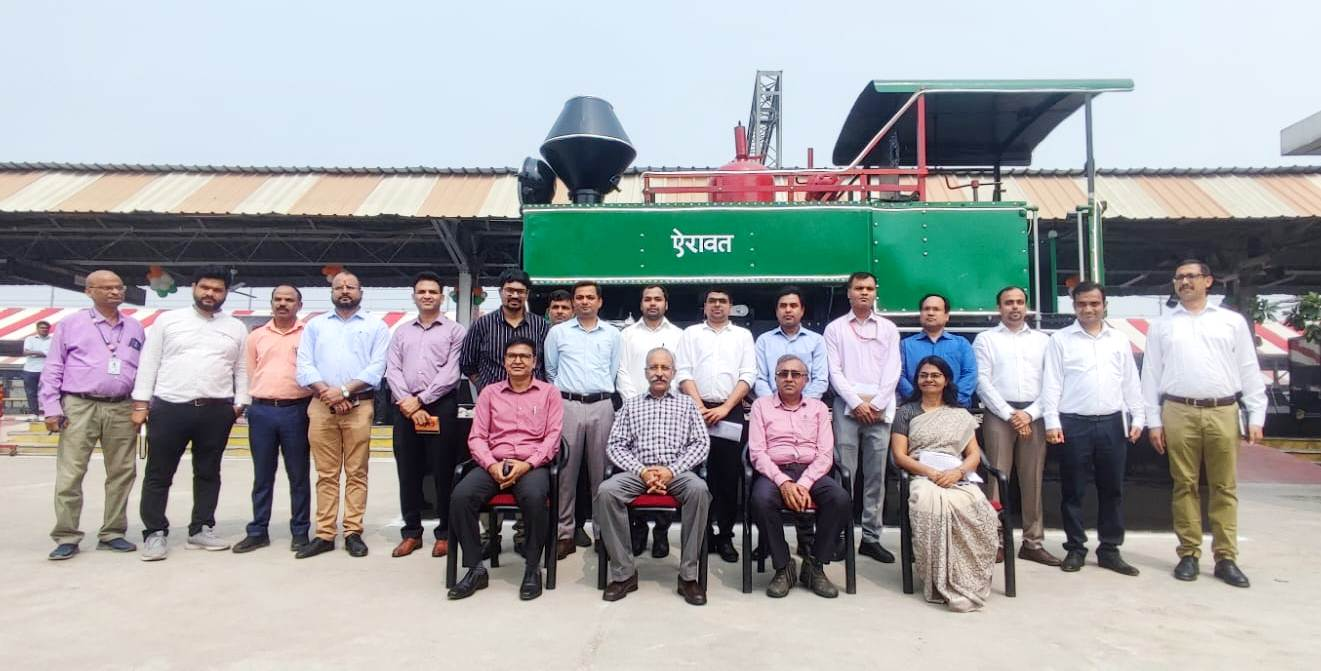
Airawat Narrow Gauge (Shri Bhuvnesh Kumar ADRM/Infra, Shri Uday Borwanker GM, Shri Gaurav Agarwal DRM, Ms Neetu ADRM/OP)

Lucknow Junction railway station celebrated its centenary in 2026, marking a century of heritage and service. The station commemorated the milestone through heritage exhibitions, cultural programmes, and restoration initiatives highlighting its historical importance in northern India's railway network.

As part of the celebrations, the Lucknow Division organised special heritage events featuring a photo gallery, vintage railway artefacts, mechanical semaphore signals, and the display of an Airawat steam engine.

The centenary events also highlighted the cinematic and cultural significance of the station and the wider North Eastern Railway network, including films and documentaries shot in the Lucknow Division.

Alongside the centenary celebrations, the North Eastern Railway initiated a beautification and redevelopment drive focusing on decongesting station entry points, improving parking facilities, and reviving the historic garden layout of the Charbagh railway complex.

A heritage exhibition showcasing the architectural and operational history of Lucknow Junction over the past century was also organised during the celebrations. A commemorative publication marking 100 years of the station was released in the presence of senior North Eastern Railway officials, including the General Manager, Shri Uday Borwanker and the Divisional Railway Manager of the Lucknow Division Shri Gaurav Agarwal.

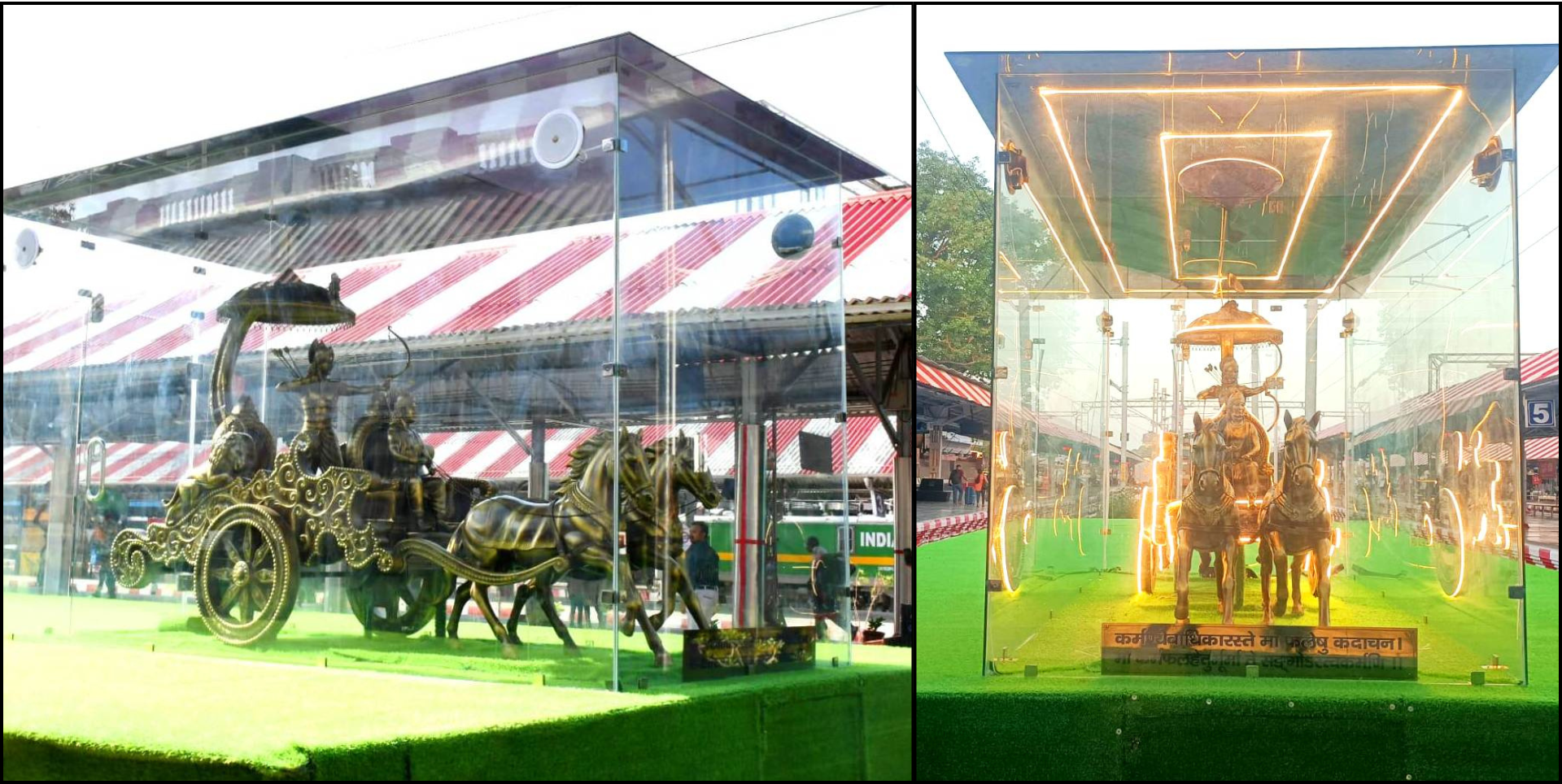
Geeta Samvad Rath

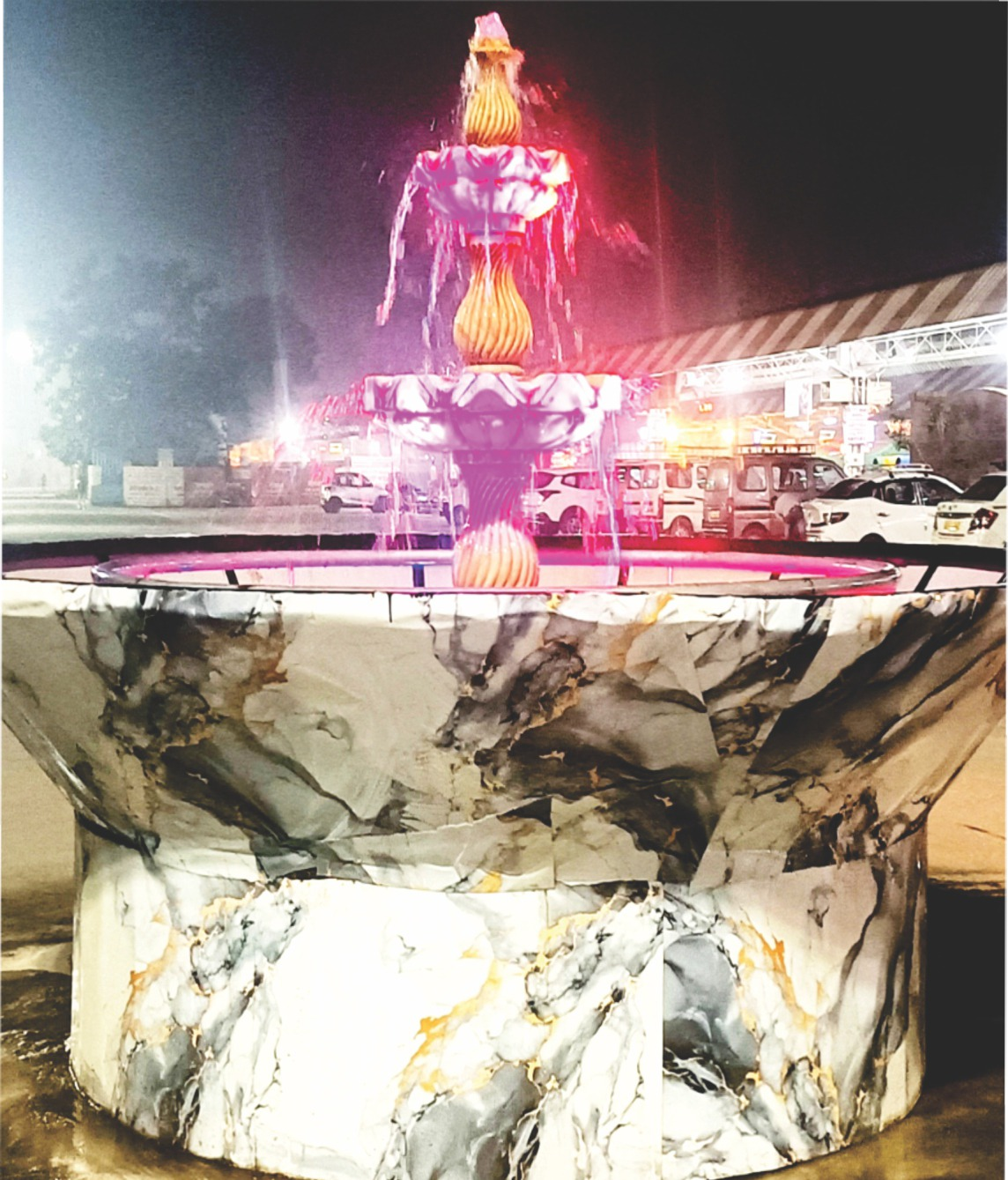
Musical fountain

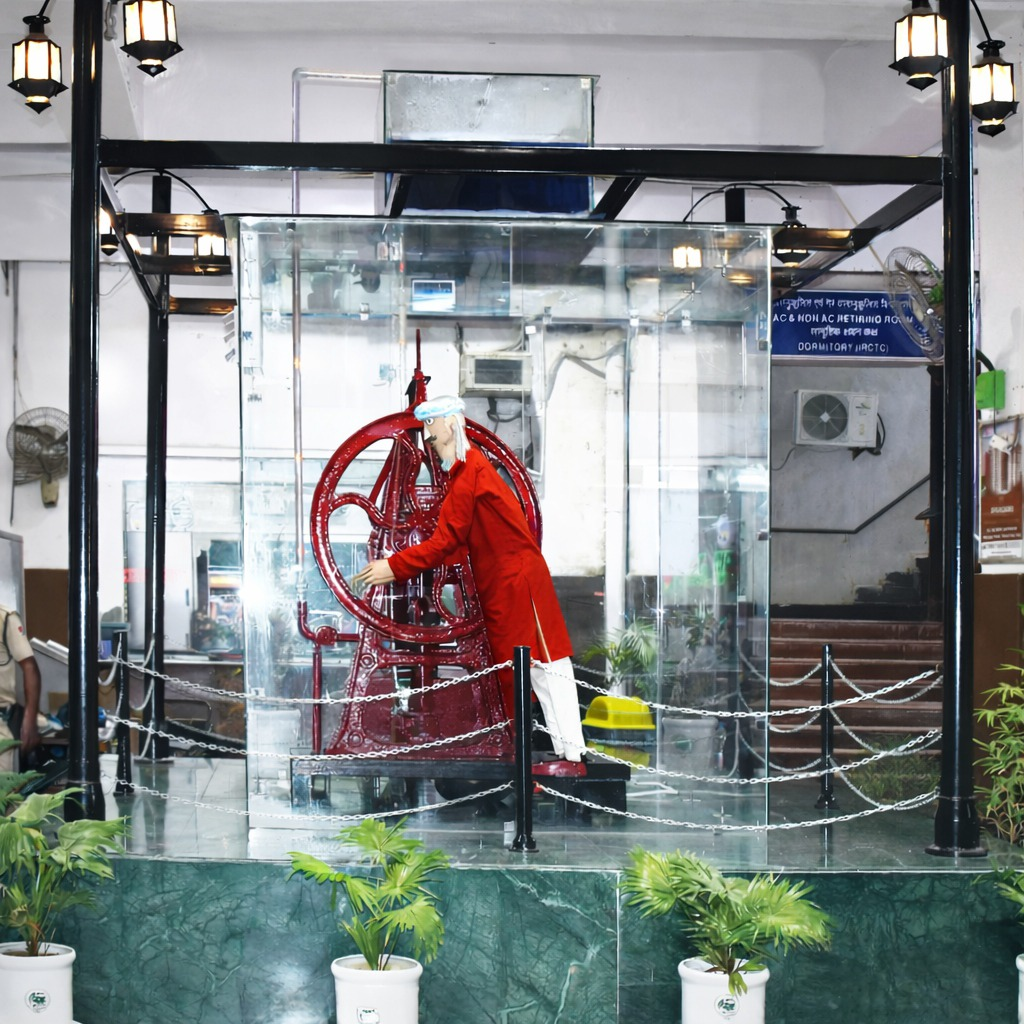
Heritage railway pump

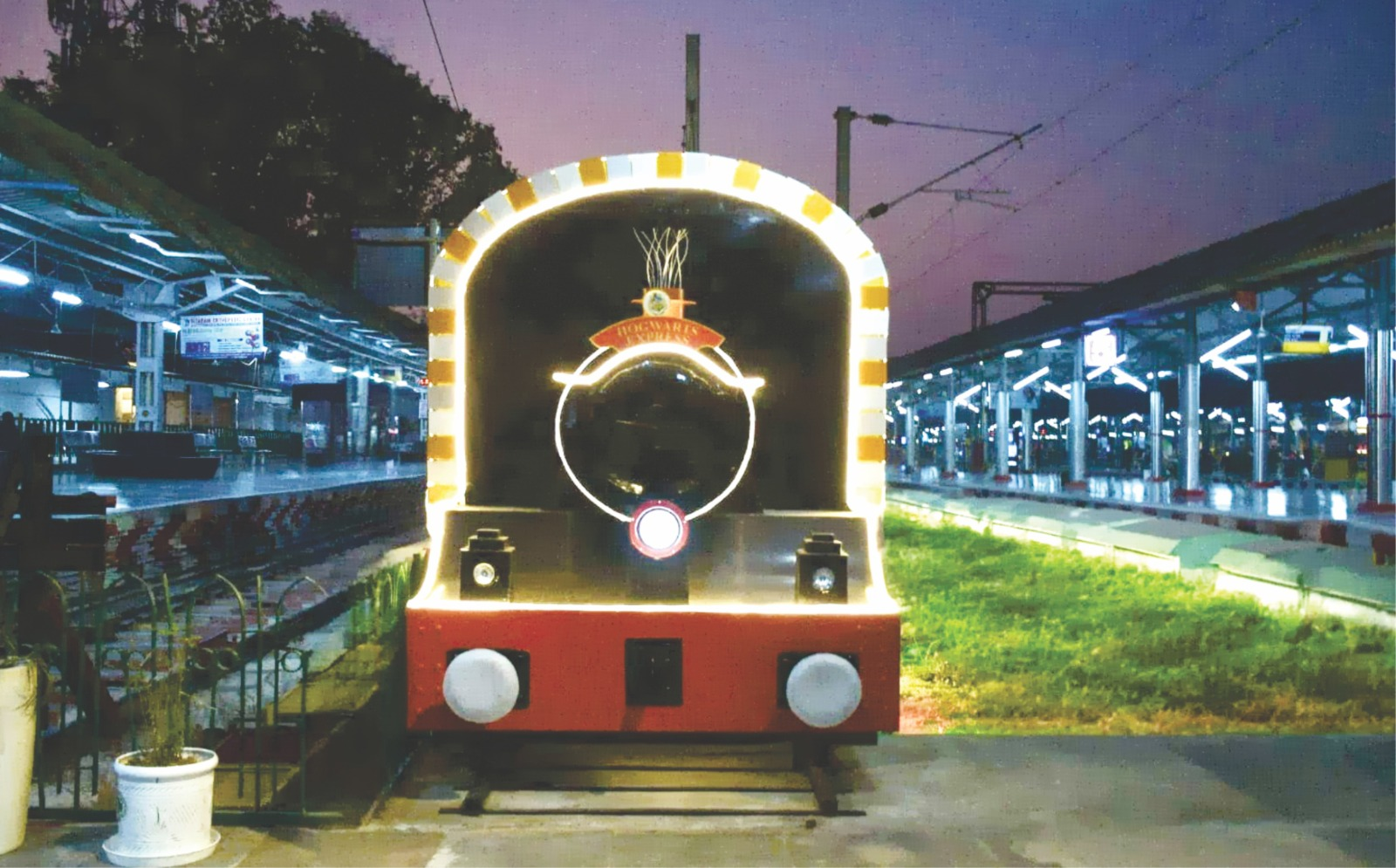
Hogwarts Model (From Harry Potter)

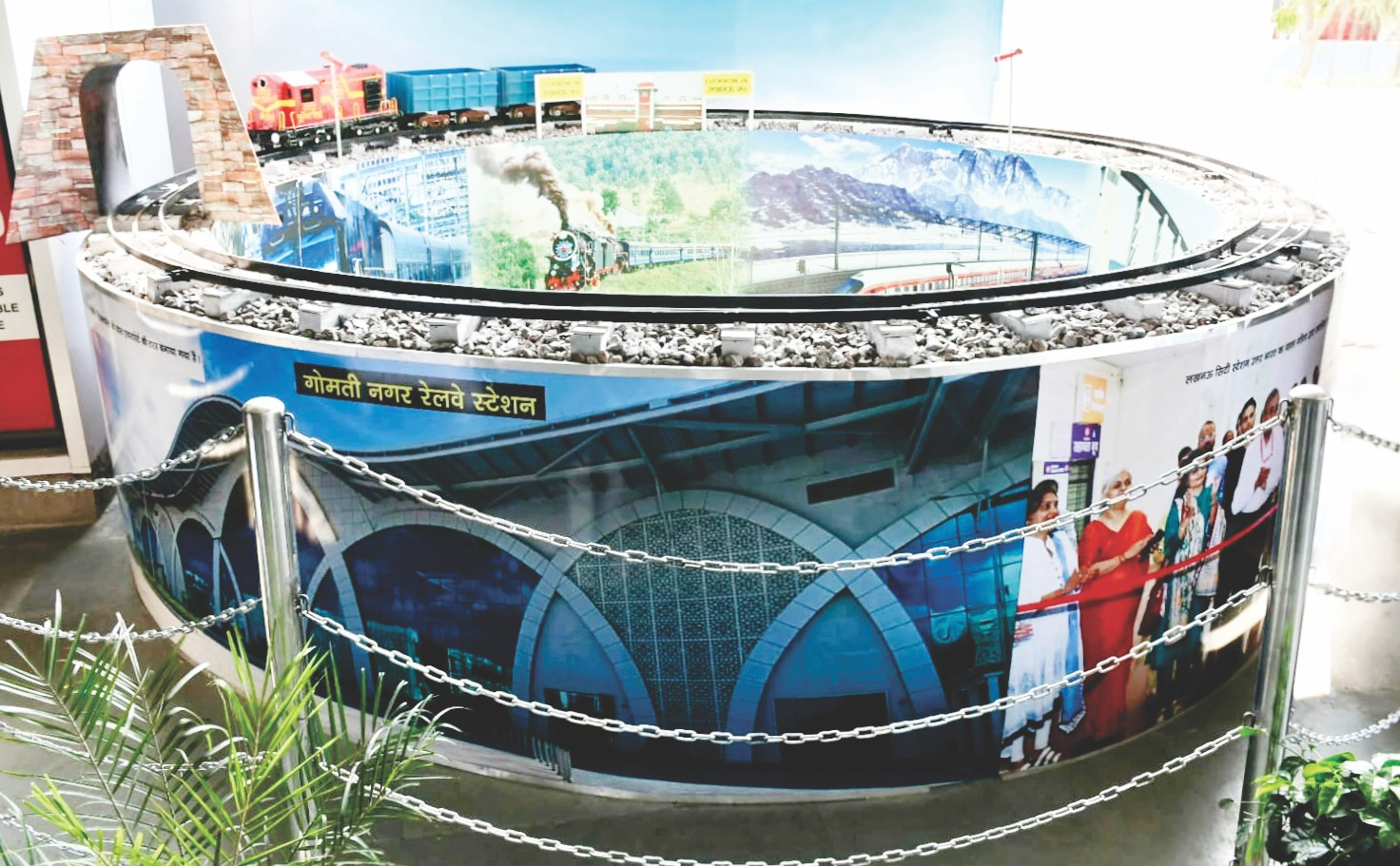
Functional Toy train

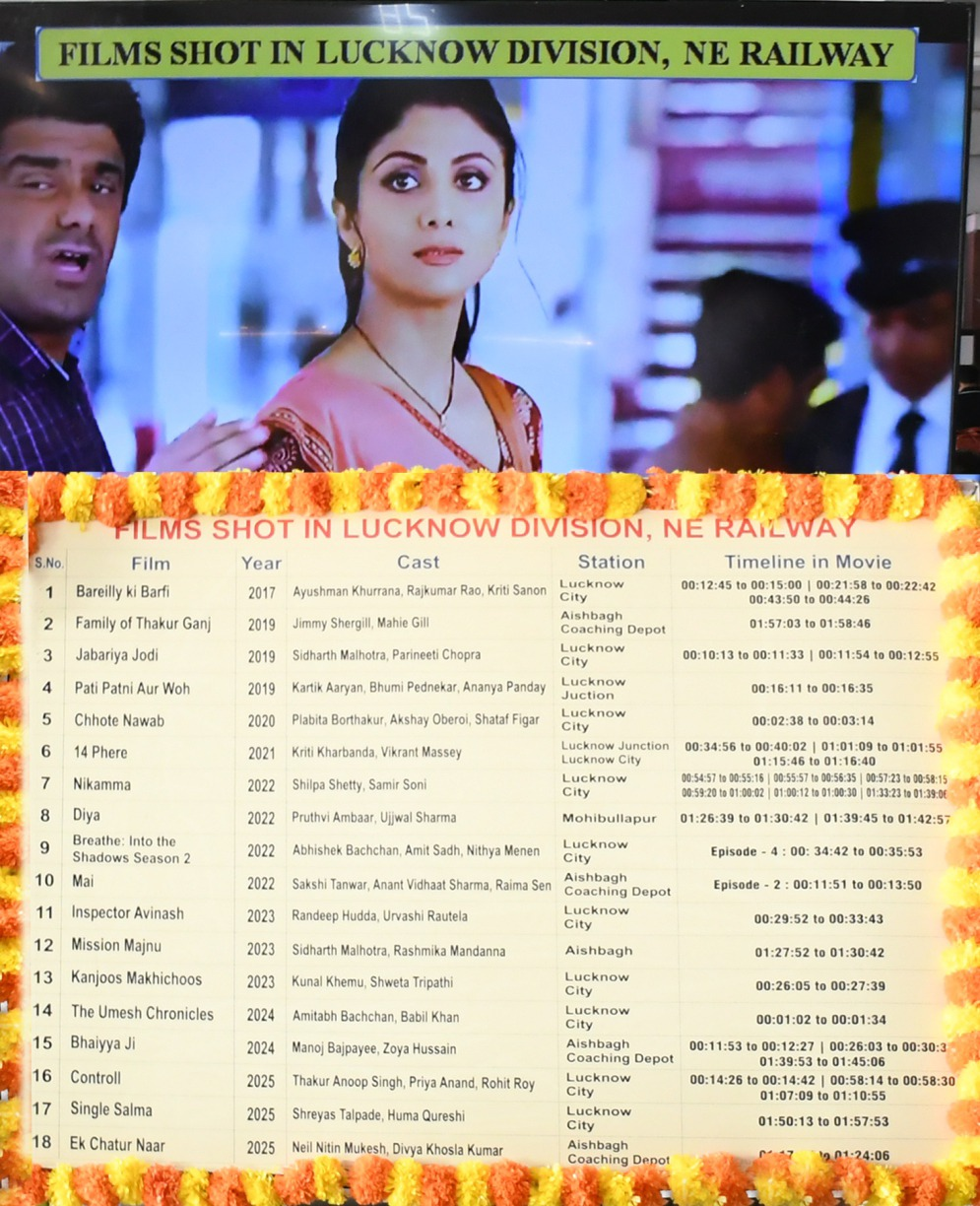
Films shot in LJN Division

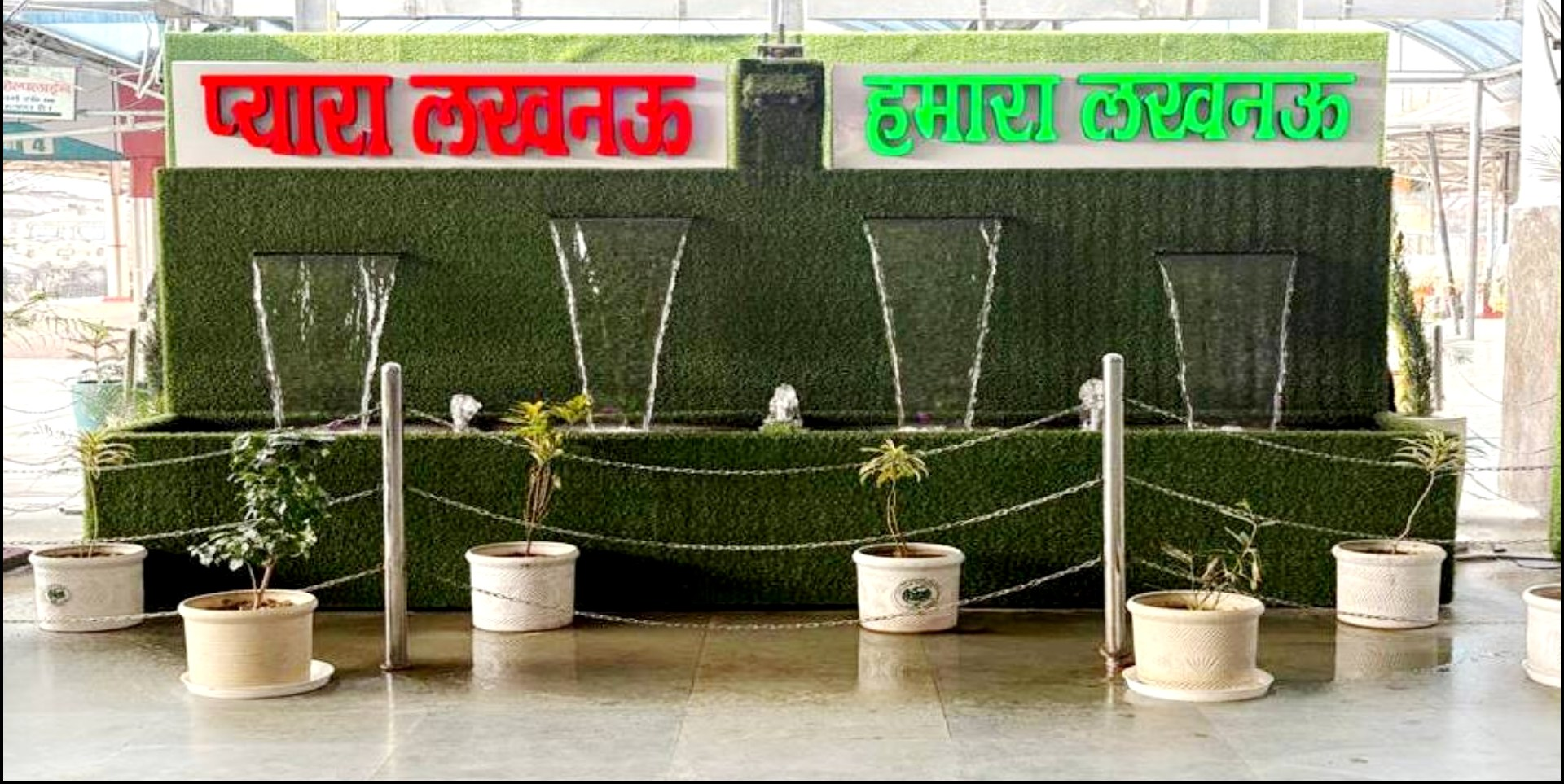
Fountain

== Certifications and recognitions ==
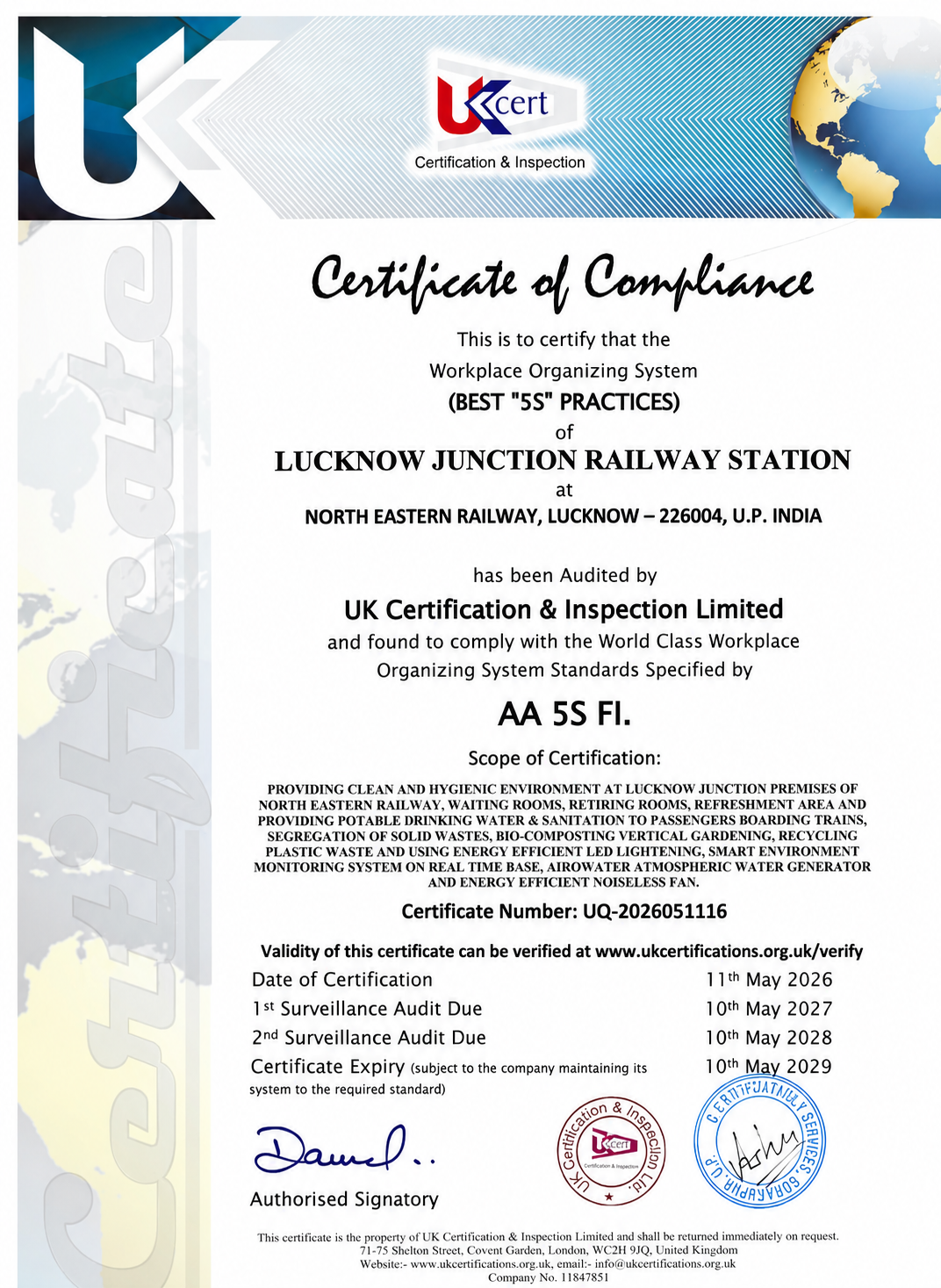
Lucknow Station 5S Certification

Lucknow Junction railway station has received recognition from Indian Railways and the North Eastern Railway zone for its passenger amenities, operational importance, and infrastructure development.

Lucknow Junction railway station received 5S (AA 5S FI) certification along with ISO 50001:2018, ISO 45001:2018, ISO 14001:2015, and ISO 9001:2015 certifications for cleanliness, workplace organisation, energy management, occupational safety standards, and environmentally sustainable station operations.

The Divisional Railway Manager's Office of the Lucknow NER railway division, North Eastern Railway zone, became the first office in Indian Railways to receive 5S Certification for excellence in workplace management, quality standards, and organisational efficiency.

Other railway facilities including Aishbagh Depot and the Linen Care Centre received 5S (AA 5S FI), ISO 50001:2018, ISO 45001:2018, ISO 14001:2015, and ISO 9001:2015 certifications for operational excellence, safety, quality management, and environmental standards.

Other stations under the division receiving these certifications include Badshahnagar, Gonda, Mankapur, Basti, Khalilabad, and Gorakhpur.
