= Charbagh metro station =

Lucknow Metro's Red Line metro station

Charbagh
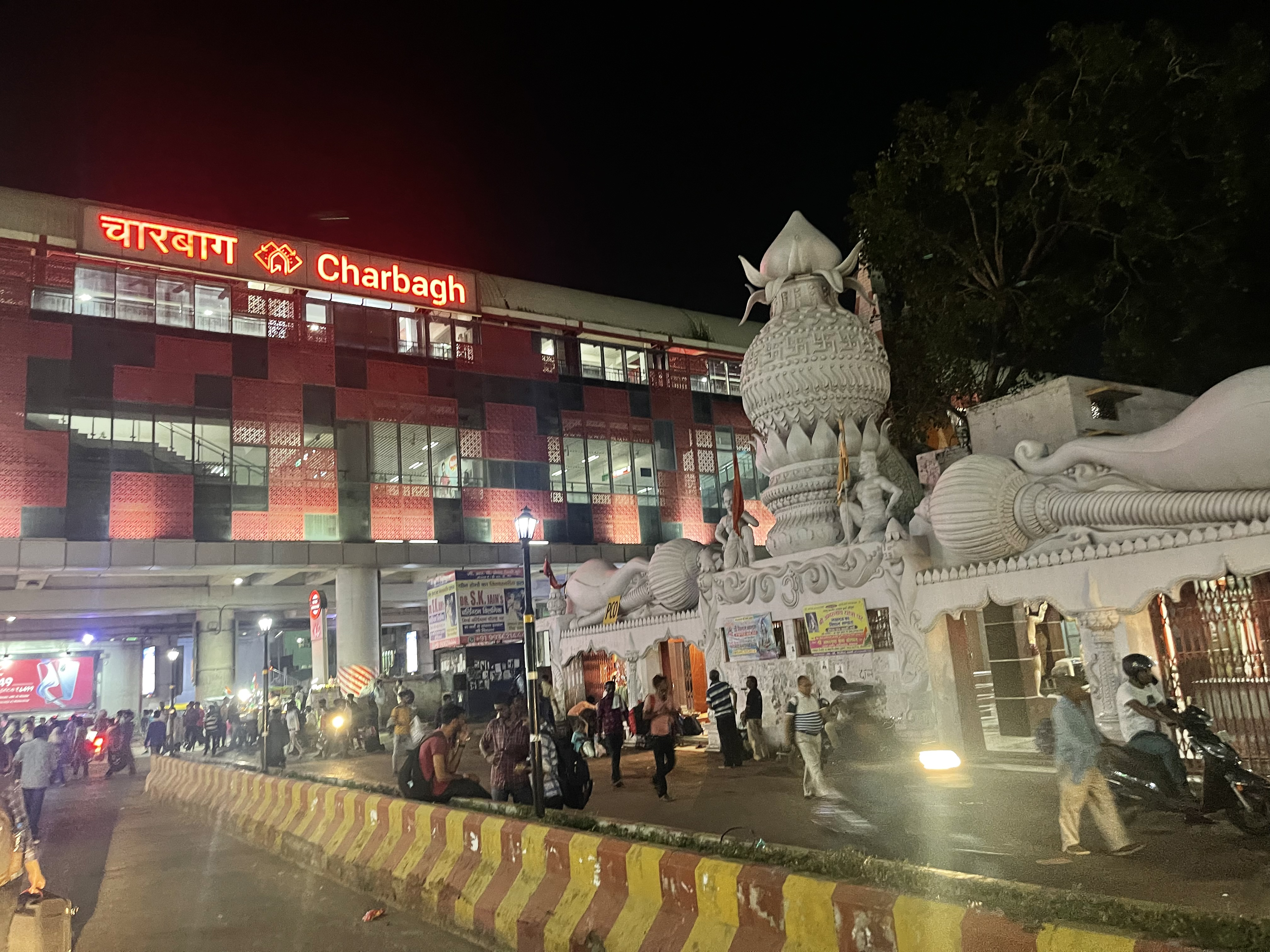

General information
- Location: Cash and Pay Colony, Charbagh, Lucknow, Uttar Pradesh 226004
- Coordinates: 26.832343°N 80.922989°E
- System: Lucknow Metro station
- Owner: Lucknow Metro
- Operator: Uttar Pradesh Metro Rail Corporation
- Line: Red Line Blue Line (Under Construction)
- Platforms: Side platform Platform-1 → Munshi Pulia; Platform-2 → CCS International Airport
- Tracks: 2; 2 Under Construction
- Connections: Lucknow Charbagh

Construction
- Structure type: Elevated, Double track
- Platform levels: 2
- Accessible: Yes
- Architectural style: Lucknow Metro

Other information
- Status: Staffed

History
- Opened: 5 September 2017; 8 years ago (Red Line)
- Electrified: Single-phase 25 kV 50 Hz AC through overhead catenary

Services
Preceding station	Lucknow Metro	Following station
Durgapuri towards CCS International Airport	Red Line	Hussainganj towards Munshi Pulia
Proposed
Terminus	Blue Line	Gautam Buddha Marg towards Vasant Kunj
Route map
Location

Charbagh is an important elevated metro station on the North-South Corridor of the Red Line of Lucknow Metro in the city of Lucknow, Uttar Pradesh, India. This metro station holds the main Lucknow Junction belonging to the Lucknow NR Division.

== Station layout ==
G	Street level	Exit/Entrance
L1	Mezzanine	Fare control, station agent, Metro Card vending machines, crossover
L2	Side platform | Doors will open on the left
L2	Platform 2 Southbound	Towards → CCS International Airport; Next Station: Durgapuri
L2	Platform 1 Northbound	Towards ← Munshi Pulia; Next Station: Hussainganj
L2	Side platform | Doors will open on the left
L2

Charbagh metro station
- Interactive map of the Charbagh metro station area

General information
- Status: Completed
- Type: Railway station
- Location: Charbagh, Lucknow, Lucknow, India
- Coordinates: 26°49′56″N 80°55′23″E
- Elevation: 126.5 m (415 ft)
- Construction started: 2014
- Completed: 2017
- Opened: 6 September 2017
- Inaugurated: 5 September 2017

Technical details
- Floor count: 2
- Lifts/elevators: 4

Design and construction
- Main contractor: Larsen & Toubro

Website
- www.lmrcl.com

== Connections ==
- Lucknow Charbagh railway station

Lucknow City Transport Services Ltd bus routes number 11, 11A, 11D, 11E, 11G, 12, 13, 15, 23, 23A, 23B, 23T, 24A, 24B, 25, 25A, 31, 31A, 33, 33B, 33C, 33M, 33PGI, 33S, 33SAKHI, 34, 34IT, 35A, 35I, 35LU, 44B, 44D, 45, 65T, 65V, 66, 66A, 66LU, 68, 69 serves the station from nearby Charbagh bus stand.

== See also ==
- Lucknow
- List of Lucknow Metro stations
- Blue Line (Lucknow Metro)
- Uttar Pradesh Metro Rail Corporation
- Uttar Pradesh State Road Transport Corporation
- List of rapid transit systems in India
- List of Metro Systems
