= Vasant Kunj metro station (Lucknow) =

Proposed Lucknow Metro station in Lucknow, Uttar Pradesh, India

Vasant Kunj

General information
- Location: Lucknow, Uttar Pradesh; India
- Elevation: 12.522 m (41.08 ft)
- Owner: Uttar Pradesh Metro Rail Corporation
- Operator: Uttar Pradesh Metro Rail Corporation
- Line: Blue Line (Proposed)

Services
Preceding station	Lucknow Metro	Following station
Proposed
Musabagh towards Charbagh	Blue Line	Terminus

Vasant Kunj is a proposed Lucknow Metro station in Lucknow, Uttar Pradesh, India.
