= Gandhi Sangrahalaya =

Gandhi Sangrahalaya is the name of several museums in India, most of them named after Mahatma Gandhi. It may refer to:

- Gandhi Sangrahalaya, Patna
- Gandhi Smarak Sangrahalaya, Ahmedabad
- National Gandhi Museum, New Delhi
- Gandhi Memorial Museum, Madurai
- Eternal Gandhi Multimedia Museum
- Indira Gandhi Rashtriya Manav Sangrahalaya
- Kaba Gandhi No Delo, Rajkot
