= Mala Pal =

Mala Pal is an Indian sculptor and traditional clay idol-maker associated with Kumartuli, Kolkata. Coming from a traditional artisan family, she broke with the long-standing convention of idol-making as a predominantly male profession in Kumartuli and established herself as an independent artist and idol-maker. She is known for her work in clay sculpture, particularly Durga idols, miniature sculptures and foldable clay idols, and for teaching traditional idol-making techniques.

== Early life and family ==
Mala Pal was born into a family associated with Bengal's traditional clay-sculpting community. Her father was Dulal Chandra Pal and her mother was Mayarani Pal. Her elder brother, Govinda Pal, was her teacher and mentor. He taught and guided her in clay modelling and idol-making and supported her development as an independent artist in Kumartuli. She initially faced restrictions on entering the family workshop because she was a girl. Following her father's death, she became more directly involved in the family's clay work and later developed an independent professional practice. She took up idol making following her father's death.

Pal studied at Giribala Sarkar School and spent part of her early life in Krishnanagar, West Bengal, before becoming associated with Kumartuli.

Govinda Pal continued to support her artistic development and remained an important mentor and guiding influence in her work.

== Career ==
Pal developed a professional practice in clay idol-making and sculpture in Kumartuli. Her work includes large Durga idols, miniature sculptures and portable or foldable clay idols.

=== Museum work ===
Following her participation in a national-level handicrafts fair in Delhi, Pal worked at the National Gandhi Museum in New Delhi. During this period, she continued her clay work and gained exposure to related artistic techniques, including painting.

Pal undertook a Durga sculpture project at the National Handicrafts and Handlooms Museum in New Delhi. The project involved creating a Durga sculpture in a traditional Bengali style as well as a more artistic interpretation.

Around 2003–2004, Pal travelled to Chennai to participate in a project at the Government Museum, Chennai. As part of the project, she created a Radha-Krishna sculpture.

=== Handicrafts fairs ===
Pal participated in a national-level handicrafts fair in Delhi, where she received recognition for her work. The experience brought her work into contact with audiences and buyers from outside Bengal.

In 2013, she participated in Milan Mela, a state-sponsored handicrafts fair organised by the Government of West Bengal. During the same period, she received recognition as Best Artisan of the District and awards associated with the Kolkata District Industries Centre and the West Bengal state government.

=== Durga sculpture ===
Durga idol-making is a major part of Pal's professional practice. She has produced large-scale Durga idols as well as miniature and foldable sculptures.

=== International work ===
Pal's sculptures have been sent outside India, and her miniature Durga sculptures have been purchased or commissioned by people outside Bengal.

A Durga idol made by Pal was sent to Switzerland. Her international work has also been discussed in profiles of women sculptors working in Kumartuli.

=== Pathshala ===
Pal established a Pathshala in Kumartuli to teach clay modelling, idol-making, painting, accessories and related traditional craft practices.

== Women in Kumartuli ==
Pal's career has been discussed in the context of the growing visibility of women in Kumartuli's traditional idol-making profession. Women have historically participated in several stages of idol production within artisan families, while principal sculptural work has more commonly been associated with men. Pal's career as an independent idol-maker has been discussed in reporting on women working in Kumartuli.

== Awards and honours ==
According to biographical documentation, Pal has received several awards and honours, including:

- First Prize/Medal — National-level Handicrafts Fair, Delhi, 1986
- Best Artisan of the District — 2013
- Kolkata District Industries Centre Award — 2013
- West Bengal State Government Award — 2013
- Sharad Samman recognitions
- Multiple Durga Puja awards, including awards associated with the Naktala Puja Committee
- Awards for large Durga sculptures
- The "Shree" title in Kumartuli
- Kumartuli Club ceremonial honour — 2016

== Personal life ==
Mala Pal is married to Bhanu Rudra Pal. They have a daughter, Beauty Pal.
