= Madhu Khanna =

Indian academic

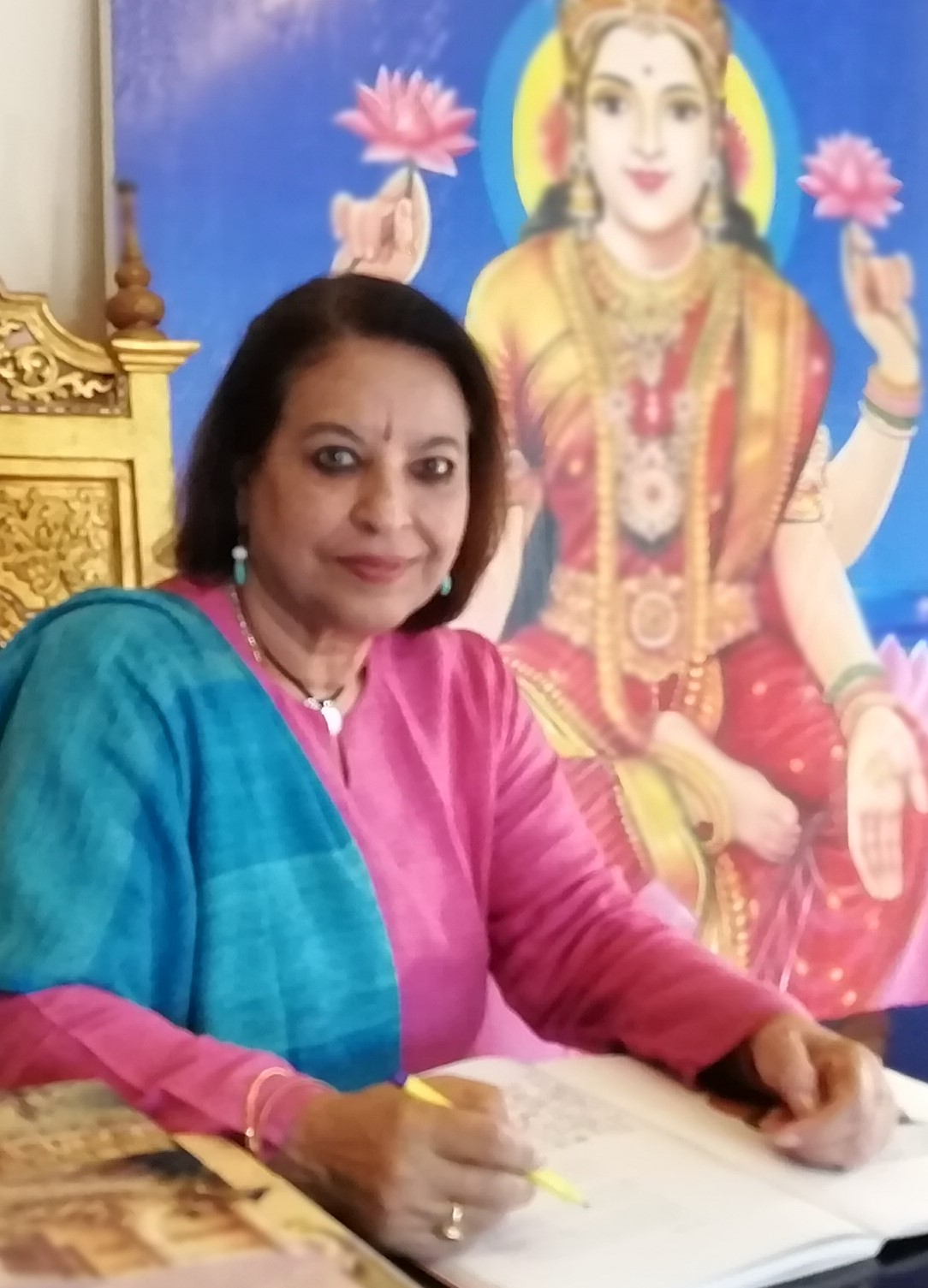

Madhu Khanna is an Indian scholar based in Delhi who works on Indic studies, Religious Studies and Tantric studies. She is a well-known expert on the goddess centric Śakta tantric traditions of India. At present she serves as the Director and founding trustee of Tantra Foundation and Shrikunja. She is also currently serving as a subject expert to the Acarya Shankar Sanskritik Ekta Nyas, set up by the culture department of the Madhya Pradesh government for their Omkareshwar Project. At present she also serves in the academic council of Nalanda University and in the fellowship council of the Indian Institute of Advanced Studies, Shimla. She has many research papers as well as several books and exhibition catalogues to her credit. She has contributed to three national projects, as well as several research projects for the Indira Gandhi National Centre for the Arts (IGNCA).

== Education ==
Khanna obtained her PhD in Indology/Religious Studies from the Faculty of Oriental Studies, University of Oxford, in 1986. Her PhD thesis was on The Concept and Liturgy of the Sricakra based on Sivananda's Trilogy, under the supervision of Professor Alexis Sanderson, Ethics and Religion, All Souls College, University of Oxford. Her subject was Esoteric Hinduism, with special reference to Hindu Tantra and Goddess Traditions. Her research has shown that the origins of Sri Vidya as a central doctrine of Shaktism were in Kashmir.

== Career ==
Khanna has served as a Professor of Religious/ Indic Studies and Director for the Centre for the Study of Comparative Religion and Civilizations, Jamia Millia Islamia, New Delhi. There she taught Hindu Studies, cross-cultural studies in the areas of Religion and Gender, Religion and Ecology and Religion and the Arts. These courses introduced by her were taught for the first time in India at Jamia. She is also credited with organising the first-ever international Religious Studies conference at Jamia. After completing her tenure at Jamia, she was awarded the Tagore National Fellowship by the National Museum, New Delhi.

Prior to this, she has been Associate Professor (Religious studies/Indic studies) at the IGNCA, where she researched and organised all major, inter-disciplinary research projects and exhibitions. Notably: Prakriti: Man in Harmony with the Elements, a cross-cultural, inter-disciplinary project; Rta: Cosmic Order & Chaos, a cross-cultural seminar which explored the multi-faceted Vedic concept of Rta, which pervades all aspects of life, the natural order, the human world, the social and the moral worlds, as well as the arts; and Rupa-Pratirupa: Man, Mind & Mask, to name a few. She conceptualised and executed Narivada: Gender, Culture & Civilization Network of the Indira Gandhi National Centre for the Arts (IGNCA), Delhi. Narada is a pioneer project that revisions and contextualizes women's cultural resources and knowledge systems in South Asia as an integral element in Gender Studies.

She has also been involved with three research-based, multi-media-exhibition projects of national interest in collaboration with the Sacred World Research Laboratory, New Delhi. The most recent of these was a project commissioned by Ayush, Ministry of Health. The project was titled Planet Health: Green Consciousness in Ayurveda and Yoga, A Multimedia Exhibit (2010). For this project in her capacity as Honorary Director for Content Research, Documentation and Production, she produced 150 documentary videos on Indian health heritage, namely Ayurveda and yoga. The project involved interviews with scholars, masters of yoga and experts in Ayurveda. For the Eternal Gandhi Multimedia Museum Exhibit (2002), she produced the content research on the life and philosophy of Mahatma Gandhi. The videos are exhibited in 51 interactive installations permanently housed in the memorial Gandhi Smriti, Birla House, New Delhi, where the Mahatma was assassinated. The Mahavira Mahatma Award was conferred upon Madhu Khanna by the Times Foundation, New Delhi, in 2005 for her work on this project. The Crossing Project: Living, Dying and Transformation in Benaras (2002) was sponsored by Xerox PARC, Palo Alto Research Center. She was conferred the Excellence in Research certificate by Xerox PARC for this project. The Crossing Project won the following awards: Winner Prix Arts Electronica, Linz, Austria, 2002; Winner ID Magazine Gold Prize, Interactive Review, New York, 2002; Jury's Recommendation, CG Arts Festival, Japan, 2002. Currently, she is the President and Founding Member of the Tantra Foundation in New Delhi. She recently initiated an ecological project, Shri Kunja – A Rural Centre for Eco Heritage in Bamunara village, Burdwan, West Bengal, to create a herbarium of traditional plants based on ancient Hindu scriptures to promote programmes for ecological sustainability.

== Awards ==
- 2005: Mahavir Mahatma Award conferred by Times Foundation, New Delhi, for the Eternal Gandhi Multimedia Museum Exhibit at the Gandhi Smriti, New Delhi (joint award with Ranjit Makkuni, Sacred World Research Laboratory).
- 2002: Excellence in Research certificate by Xerox PARC, Palo Alto, for The Crossing Project: Living, Dying and Transformation in Benaras
- 2000 Awarded Sarasvati Ratna Abhisekha, Bharat Gaurava Sammana, by Samaratha Siksha Samiti, Delhi for contribution to Tantra-studies.
- 1991–1993: The Homi Bhabha Fellowship Award for advanced research by the Homi Bhabha Fellowships Council, Bombay
- 1980-1982 Inlaks Foundation Award for doctoral research in Sanskrit Studies at the Oxford University.

== Selected works ==
=== Books ===
- The Sricakra as Goddess Tripurasundari: History, Symbol & Ritual. Madhu Khanna. Forthcoming 2023–2024.
- Tantra on the Edge: Inspirations and Experiments in Twentieth-Century Indian Art. Madhu Khanna. Published by Delhi Art Gallery, New Delhi, 2022. ISBN 978-93-81217-91-7
- Encyclopaedia of Indian religion: Hinduism and Tribal Religions. Edited by Jeffery Long, Rita D Sherma, Pankaj Jain and Madhu Khanna. Published by Springer Nature B.V. 2022. ISBN 978-94-024-1187-4
- Saktapramodah of Deva Nandan Singh. Edited with introduction in English by Madhu Khanna. Published in collaboration with Rashtriya Sanskrit Sansthan and Tantra Foundation. D.K. Printworld, New Delhi, 2013. ISBN 978-81-246-0689-6.
- Asian Perspectives on the World’s Religions after 11 September. Arvind Sharma and Madhu Khanna (Editors). Praeger, ABC-CLIO, LLC, California, 2013. ISBN 978-0-313-37896-6, E ISBN 978-0-313-37897-3.
- Thirty Minor Upanisadas. Translated by K. Narayanasvami Aiyar. Edited by Madhu Khanna. Tantra Foundation, New Delhi, 2011. ISBN 81208-1565-3.
- The Subtle Body: An Illuminated Tantric Scroll. Sarabhai Foundation, Ahmedabad, 2005. ISBN 8186980261.
- Yantra: The Tantric Symbol of Cosmic Unity. Madhu Khanna. Thames and Hudson, 1994. Inner Traditions, 1997 (Reprint), 2003 (Reprint). ISBN 978-0-89281-132-8. German edition: Yantra: Das Grosse Yantra-Buch – Symbol der Kosmischen Einheit, Aurum Verlag, Freiburg, 1980. ISBN 978-3-591-08138-2. Italian edition: Yanta: Il Simbolo Tantrico dell'Unita Cosmica, Edizioni Mediterranee, Milan, 2002. ISBN 88-272-1472-0.
- Rta, The Cosmic Order. Edited by Madhu Khanna. Indira Gandhi National Centre for the Arts & D.K. Printworld, New Delhi, 2004. ISBN 8124602522.
- Art, the Integral Vision: A Volume of Essays in Felicitation of Kapila Vatsyayan. Kapila Vatsyayan, Baidyanath Saraswati, S C Malik, & Madhu Khanna. DK Printworld. 1995.
- The Tantric Way: Art, Science, Ritual. Ajit Mookerjee & Madhu Khanna. Thames and Hudson, 1977 (Reprint). 1989 (Reprint), 1993 (Reprint), 1994 (Reprint), 1996 (Reprint). ISBN 0-500-27088-0. French edition: La voie du Tantra: Art, Science, Rituel. Seuil, Paris, 1978; 2004 (Reprint). German edition: Die Welt des Tantra in Bild und Deutung. Otto Wilehelm Berth Verlag, Munich, 1978; 1987 (Reprint). ISBN 978-3-502-65471-1. Danish edition: Forlaget Rhodes, Copenhagen, 1979. ISBN 87-74-96-6618.

=== Exhibition catalogues ===
- The Crossing Project: Living, Dying and Transformation in Banaras. Co-author. Sacred World Foundation, New Delhi and San Francisco, 2002.
- An Exhibition on Tantra Art Collection by Shinsocha, Tokyo. Contributor.
- Man & Mask: Rupa-Pratirupa: An Exhibition from the IGNCA Collection of Masks. Editor. Indira Gandhi National Centre for the Arts, 1998.
- Rta-Ritu: Cosmic Order and Cycle of Seasons. Editor. Indira Gandhi National Centre for the Arts, 1996.
- Prakriti: Man in Harmony with the Elements. Editor. Indira Gandhi National Centre for the Arts, 1994.
