= Krishna Nagar metro station =

Krishna Nagar metro station may refer to these metro stations in India:

- Krishna Nagar metro station (Delhi)
- Krishna Nagar metro station (Lucknow)

== See also ==
- Krishna Nagar (disambiguation)
