= Nadia District (1787–1947) =

Nadia District (1781-1947) নদীয়া জিলা (১৭৮১-১৯৪৭)
- 1787–1947
- Capital and largest city: Krishna Nagar
- Official languages: Bengali, English
- Religion: Islam (majority); Hinduism (minority)
- Demonym: Nadiyayi
- Legislature: Bengal Legislative Assembly
- Historical era: Bengal presidency, Bengal with Sikkim, Province of Bengal
  - Founded: 1787
  - Disestablished: 1947

Area
  - Total: 7,423 km^{2} (2,866 sq mi)

Population
  - 1941 estimate: 1,759,846
  - 1941 census: 1941
  - Density: 237/km^{2} (613.8/sq mi)
Preceded by	Succeeded by
Bengal Subah	Kushtia District (1947-1984); Nadia district
- Today part of: Bangladesh, West Bengal

Nadia District (1787–1947) (Bengali: নদীয়া জিলা (১৭৮৭–১৯৪৭) or Undivided Nadia District (Bengali: অবিভক্ত নদীয়া জিলা) is one of the few districts formed under British East India company rule in Bengal presidency.

== Formation ==
The district was formed on 13 March 1787 through the proposal submitted by Mr. John Snore comprising the areas of Hooghly of Bardhaman Raj and Jessore districts.

== History ==
In 1808, robbery was quite prevalent in this district because of famine. In 1857 English officers were rescued from rebels. Constant rebellion was happened against Indigo plantation.

== Administration ==
After the formation, Nadia was kept under Jessore division until 1854. The center of Nadia was Krishna Nagar town. Till 1930, Nadia had 5 subdivisions; Kushtia, Chuadanga, Meherpur, Ranaghat, Krishna Nagar.

=== Sub divisions of Nadia ===
==== Kushtia subdivision ====
- Kushtia thana
- Mirpur thana
- Khoksa thana
- Daulatpur thana
- Bhairamara thana
- Kumarkhali thana

==== Chuadanga subdivision ====
- Chuadanga thana
- Alamdanga thana
- Damurhuda thana
- Jiban Nagar thana
- Krishnaganj thana

==== Meherpur subdivision ====
- Meherpur thana
- Gangni thana
- Karimpur thana
- Tehatta thana

==== Nadia Sadar subdivision ====
- Krishnanagar thana (Nadia Sadar)
- Chapra thana
- Nabadwip thana
- Nakashipara thana
- Kaliganj thana

==== Ranaghat subdivision ====
- Ranaghat thana
- Santipur thana
- Chakdaha thana
- Hanskhali thana
- Haringhata thana

== Demographics ==
According to 1941 census Muslim community happens to be the single largest community formed 61.26% out of 1759846.

Religion in Nadia district (1941)
Islam	61.26%
Hinduism	37.88%
Christianity	0.65%
Other or not stated	0.21%

== Aftermath of Partition of 1947 ==
Undivided Nadia district of Province of Bengal got divided into newly formed Kushtia district of East Bengal and Nadia district of West Bengal according to revised Radcliffe Line.

== See also ==
- Nadia district
- Kushtia District
- Chuadanga District
- Meherpur District
