= Indian Independence Act 1947 =

Act of the Parliament of the United Kingdom

Indian Independence Act 1947 (Note: Section 20.)
- Act of Parliament
- Parliament of the United Kingdom
- Long title: An Act to make provision for the setting up in India of two independent dominion states, to substitute other provisions for certain provisions of the Government of India Act, 1935, which apply outside those dominions, and to provide for other matters consequential on or connected with the setting up of those Dominions.
- Citation: 10 & 11 Geo. 6. c. 30
- Territorial extent: United Kingdom; British India

Dates
- Royal assent: 18 July 1947
- Commencement: 15 August 1947 (Note: Section 1(1).)
- Repealed: India: 26 January 1950; Pakistan: 23 March 1956
Other legislation
Amended by	Revision of the Army and Air Force Acts (Transitional Provisions) Act 1955; Naval Discipline Act 1957; Statute Law (Repeals) Act 1976; Family Law Act 1986; Statute Law (Repeals) Act 1993; Statute Law (Repeals) Act 1998
Repealed by	India: Constitution of India; Pakistan: Constitution of Pakistan of 1956

Status: Partially repealed

Text of statute as originally enacted

Text of the Indian Independence Act 1947 as in force today (including any amendments) within the United Kingdom, from legislation.gov.uk.

The Indian Independence Act 1947 (10 & 11 Geo. 6. c. 30) is an act of the Parliament of the United Kingdom that partitioned British India into the two new independent dominions of India and Pakistan. On 15 July 1947 the House of Commons voted for the bill and the House of Lords gave its consent on the next day. The act received Royal Assent on 18 July 1947 and thus India and Pakistan (the latter including modern-day Bangladesh) came into being on 15 August. (Note: Independence was at midnight on the 14/15 August, Pakistan chose to celebrate independence on the 14th and India on the 15th.)

The legislature representatives of the Indian National Congress, the Muslim League, and the Sikh community came to an agreement with Lord Mountbatten, then Viceroy and Governor-General of India, on what has come to be known as the 3 June Plan or Mountbatten Plan.

== Prelude ==
=== Attlee's announcement ===
Clement Attlee, the prime minister of the United Kingdom, announced on 20 February 1947 that:

1. The British Government would grant full self-government to British India by June 30, 1948 at the latest,
2. The future of the Princely States would be decided after the date of final transfer is decided.

=== Third June Plan ===
The 3rd June 1947 Plan was also known as the Mountbatten Plan. The British government proposed a plan, announced on 3 June 1947, that included these principles:

1. Principle of the partition of British India was accepted by the British Government
2. Successor governments would be given dominion status
3. Autonomy and sovereignty to both countries
4. Can make their own constitution
5. Princely states were given the right to join either India or Pakistan (with no option to remain independent), based on two major factors: geographical contiguity and the people's wishes.

== Provisions ==
The act's most important provisions were:

- Division of British India into the two new dominions – the Dominion of India and the Dominion of Pakistan – with effect from 15 August 1947;
- Partition of the provinces of Bengal and Punjab between the two new countries;
- Establishment of the office of Governor-General in each of the two new countries, as representatives of the Crown;
- Conferral of complete legislative authority upon the respective Constituent Assemblies of the two new countries;
- Termination of British suzerainty over the princely states, with effect from 15 August 1947. These states could decide to join either India or Pakistan;
- Abolition of the use of the title "Emperor of India" by the British monarch (this was subsequently executed by King George VI by royal proclamation on 22 June 1948);

The act also made provision for the division of joint property, etc. between the two new countries, including in particular the division of the armed forces.

== Salient features ==
1. Two new dominion states: Two new dominions were to emerge from the Indian empire: India and Pakistan.
2. Appointed Date: 15 August 1947 was declared as the appointed date for the partition.
3. Territories:
  1. Pakistan: East Bengal, West Punjab, Sindh, and Chief Commissioner's Province of Baluchistan.
  2. The fate of the North-West Frontier Province (now Khyber Pakhtunkhwa) was subject to the result of a referendum.
  3. Bengal & Assam:
    1. The province of Bengal as constituted under the Government of India Act 1935 ceased to exist.
    2. In lieu thereof two new provinces were to be constituted, to be known respectively as East Bengal and West Bengal.
    3. The fate of District Sylhet, in the province of Assam, was to be decided in a referendum.
  4. Punjab:
    1. The province as constituted under the Government of India Act 1935 ceased to exist.
    2. Two new provinces were to be constituted, to be known respectively as West Punjab and East Punjab.
4. The boundaries of the new provinces were to be determined, whether before or after the appointed date, by the award of a boundary commission to be appointed by the Governor-General.
5. Constitution for the New Dominions: until the time of the making of the new constitution, the new dominions and the provinces thereof were to be governed by the Government of India Act 1935. (Temporary Provisions as to the Government of Each New Dominion).
6. The Governors-General of the new dominions:
  1. For each of the new dominions a new Governor-General was to be appointed by the Crown, subject to the law of the legislature of either of the new dominions.
  2. Same person as Governor-General of both dominions: if unless and until provision to the contrary was made by a law of the legislature of either of the new dominions, the same person could be the Governor-General of both.
7. Powers of Governor-General: (Section-9)
  1. The Governor-General was empowered to bring this Act into force.
  2. Division of territories, powers, duties, rights, assets, liabilities, etc., was the responsibility of Governor General.
  3. To adopt, amend, Government of India Act 1935, as the Governor-General may consider it necessary.
  4. power to introduce any change was until 31 March 1948, after that it was open to the constituent assembly to modify or adopt the same Act. (Temporary Provisions as to the Government of Each New Dominion.)
  5. Governor-General had full powers to give assent to any law.
8. Legislation for the new dominions:
  1. The existing legislative setup was allowed to continue as Constitution making body as well as a legislature. (Temporary Provisions as to the Government of Each New Dominion.)
  2. The legislature of each dominion was given full powers to make laws for that dominion, including laws having extraterritorial operation.
  3. No Act of Parliament of UK passed after the appointed date would be extended to the territories of new dominions.
  4. No law and provision of any law made by the legislature of the new dominions shall be void or inoperative on the ground that it is repugnant to the law of England.
  5. The Governor-General of each dominion had full powers to give assent in His Majesty's name to any law of the legislature. [Configuration of Pakistan's Constitution Assembly (CAP I): 79 (69 members of the central legislature + 10 immigrant members) ].
9. Consequences of setting up of the new dominions:
  1. His Majesty's Government lost all the responsibility to the new dominions.
  2. The suzerainty of His Majesty's Government over the Indian States lapsed.
  3. All the treaties or agreements with the Indian States and the tribal areas that were in force at the passing of the act lapsed.
  4. The title of "Emperor of India" was dropped from the titles of British Crown.
  5. The office of Secretary of State for India was abolished and the provisions of GOI Act 1935 relating to the appointments to the civil service or civil posts under the crown by the secretary of the state ceased to operate.
10. Civil servants: Section 10 provided for the continuance of service of the government servants appointed on or before 15 August 1947 under the Governments of new Dominions with full benefits.
11. Armed Forces: Sections 11, 12, and 13 dealt with the future of the Indian armed forces. A Partition Committee was formed on 7 June 1947, with two representatives from each side and the viceroy in the chair, to decide about the division thereof. As soon as the process of partition was to start it was to be replaced by a Partition Council with a similar structure.
12. First and Second Schedules:
  1. First Schedule listed the districts provisionally included in the new province of East Bengal:
    1. Chittagong Division: Districts of Chittagong, Chittagong Hill Tracts, Noakhali and Tipperah.
    2. Dacca Division: Districts of Bakarganj, Dacca, Faridpur, and Mymensingh.
    3. Presidency Division: Districts of Jessore (except Bangaon Tehsil), and Kushtia, Chuadanga and Meherpur Tehsils (of Nadia district).
    4. Rajshahi Division:Districts of Bogra, Dinajpur (except Raiganj and Balurghat Tehsil), Rajshahi, Rangpur and Nawabganj Tehsil (of Malda district).
  2. Second Schedule listed the districts provisionally included in the new province of West Punjab:
    1. Lahore Division: Districts of Gujranwala, Lahore (except Patti Tehsil), Sheikhupura, Sialkot and Shakargarh Tehsil (of Gurdaspur district).
    2. Rawalpindi Division: Districts of Attock, Gujrat, Jehlum, Rawalpindi and Shahpur.
    3. Multan Division: Districts of Dera Ghazi Khan, Jhang, Lyallpur, Montgomery, Multan and Muzaffargarh.

== Partition ==
There was so much violence, and many Muslims from what would become India fled to Pakistan; and Hindus and Sikhs from what would become Pakistan fled to India. Many people left behind all their possessions and property to avoid the violence and flee to their new country.

== Princely states ==
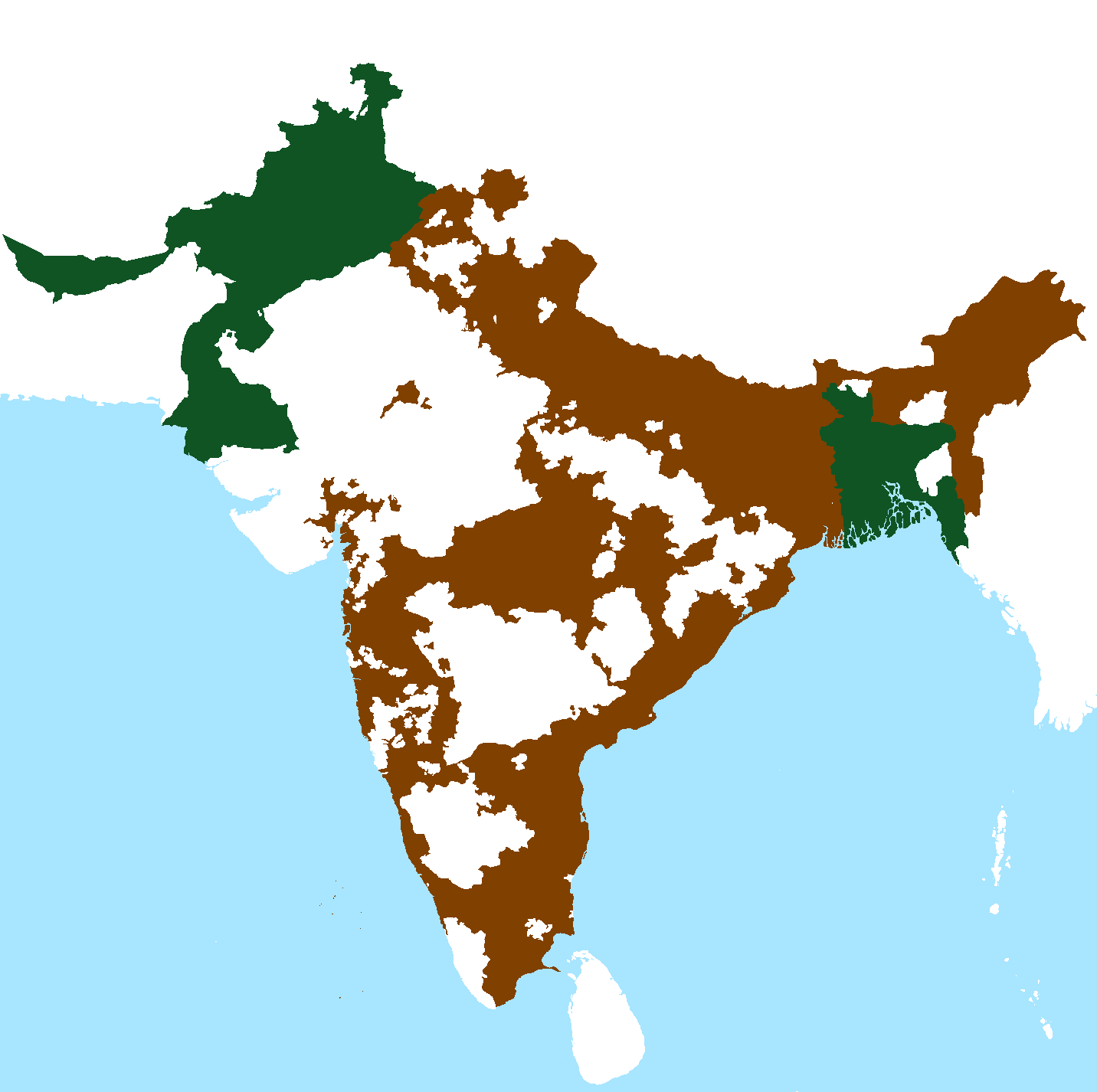
The territory of British India partitioned between India (brown) and Pakistan (green). The remaining unshaded areas were princely states.

On 25 July 1947, Lord Mountbatten addressed a special full meeting of the Chamber of Princes concerning the future of the princely states, which he described as numbering something as "565". Under the Indian Independence Act 1947, India and Pakistan became independent Dominions on 15 August 1947. From that date, the Crown's suzerainty over the Indian states lapsed, together with its treaties, obligations, authority, and jurisdiction relating to them, although certain arrangements concerning customs, transit, communications, posts, and telegraphs could continue temporarily. Mountbatten acknowledged that the states would technically and legally become independent, but urged them to accede to the appropriate Dominion while recognising that "geographical compulsions" would restrict their choice. The proposed accession arrangement covered defence, external affairs, and communications, while preserving the states’ internal autonomy in other matters. Mountbatten argued that most states could not effectively manage those three functions by themselves, making complete independence impractical rather than legally impossible.

=== India ===
Lord Mountbatten continued as the first Governor General of independent India. Jawaharlal Nehru became the prime minister and Vallabhbhai Patel became the home minister.

Over 550 princely states, almost all of the states contiguous with the territory of India, acceded to India by 15 August. The exceptions were Junagadh, Hyderabad, and Jammu and Kashmir.

Contiguous to both India and Pakistan, the princely state of Jammu and Kashmir, on account of its 77% Muslim majority, was expected to accede to Pakistan. When Maharaja Hari Singh hesitated to do this, Pakistan launched a tribal invasion in an effort to persuade him. Instead, he chose to accede to India. The state has been disputed between India and Pakistan ever since.

The state of Junagadh initially acceded to Pakistan but faced a revolt from its Hindu population. India considered the accession of Junagadh invalid because it violated the principle of geographical contiguity of the partition, but Pakistan argued that the maritime border of Junagadh is connected to Pakistan by sea route. Following a breakdown of law and order, its Dewan requested India to take over the administration on 8 November 1947. India conducted a referendum in the state on 20 February 1948, in which the people voted overwhelmingly to join India.

The state of Hyderabad had a majority Hindu population but also a Muslim ruler with a large Muslim minority. The Nizam of Hyderabad wanted to get Dominion status. Hyderabad elected to maintain its independence and lobbied internationally for recognition. However, it faced the pro-communist Telangana Rebellion and agitation by Indian nationalists opposed to its independence. On 13 September 1948, the Indian government launched an invasion of Hyderabad called Operation Polo. The Hyderabadi military was defeated over five days of fighting. With his state about to be over run, the Nizam signed the Instrument of Accession, joining India. The formal integration of Hyderabad into the dominion of India took place much later on January 25, 1950, when the Nizam signed the Instrument of Accession with the central government. A day later, as India became a republic on January 26, the Nizam took over as the Raj Pramukh or governor.

=== Pakistan ===
Muhammad Ali Jinnah became the governor-general of Pakistan, and Liaquat Ali Khan became the prime minister of Pakistan.

Between October 1947 and March 1948 the rulers of several Muslim-majority states signed instruments of accession to join Pakistan. These included Amb, Bahawalpur, Chitral, Dir, Kalat, Khairpur, Kharan, Las Bela, Makran, and Swat. The Khanate of Kalat initially elected to resume its independence, until 27 March 1948 when its ruler acceded to Pakistan.

== Subsequent developments ==
The Indian Independence Act was subsequently repealed in Article 395 of the Constitution of India and in Article 221 of the Constitution of Pakistan of 1956, both constitutions being intended to bring about greater independence for the new states. The act has not been repealed in the United Kingdom, where it still has an effect, although some sections of it have been repealed.

Sections 2–5, 6(1)–(3), 6(5), 8–12, in section 14, in subsection (2), the words from "or as applying" onwards; and subsections (3) and (4), in section 15(3), the words from "and any legal proceedings" onwards, section 16, 18(3)–(5) and 19 of, and schedules 1 and 2 to, the act were repealed by section 1(1) of, and part VII of schedule 1 to, the Statute Law (Repeals) Act 1976, which came into force on 27 May 1976.

== See also ==
- Indian independence movement
- Pakistan Movement
- Partition of India
- Political integration of India

Comparable acts in Dominion nation-building

- Anglo-Irish Treaty of 1921
- Canadian Confederation
- Ceylon Independence Act 1947
- Federation of Australia
- National Convention (South Africa)
- New Zealand Constitution Act 1852
