= Transport Nagar railway station =

Railway station in Lucknow, India

General information
- Location: Transport Nagar, Kanpur Road Lucknow, Uttar Pradesh, India
- Coordinates: 26°46′39″N 80°54′08″E
- Elevation: 123.500 metres (405.18 ft)
- Owner: Indian Railways
- Lines: Allahabad–Lucknow–Moradabad line Pratapgarh–Lucknow–Moradabad line Sultanpur–Lucknow line Lucknow–Moradabad–Delhi line Transport Nagar–Hardoi line
- Platforms: 3 under construction
- Tracks: 6 under construction
- Connections: Taxi stand, Auto stand

Construction
- Structure type: Standard on-ground station
- Parking: Available
- Cycle facilities: Available
- Accessible: Lucknow NR

Other information
- Station code: TPNR
- Fare zone: Northern Railway, Lucknow NR railway division
Location
- Location within India Location within Uttar Pradesh

Transport Nagar railway station is a planned railway station in the Sharda Nagar area of southern Lucknow. It lies on Lucknow–Kanpur highway. Northern Railway will develop a railway station here to decongest Charbagh railway station. Trains from Raebareli, Varanasi, Allahabad, Pratapgarh, Jaunpur, Zafrabad, Hardoi, Moradabad, Delhi, and Shahjahanpur will originate, terminate, and pass through this station. All trains from Varanasi can pass on to Moradabad – Delhi route without passing through Charbagh Station.

== Connectivity ==
Transport Nagar railway station will be connected to rest of the city with Transport Nagar metro station, which lies on north–south corridor. It will also be linked to city via local bus, auto services. One of the two main inter State bus terminals of the city i.e., Alambagh bus terminal is just 2 miles away.

== Related railway projects ==
=== Transport Nagar Goods Yard ===
NR is deciding to shift the Charbagh Goods Yard to Transport Nagar. This is so because railway has a lot of land in Transport Nagar area to develop a goods yard and a passenger terminal. This is also because the number of platforms needs to be increased in Charbagh station for which land is required.

=== Utrahtia–Zafrabad doubling ===
The Utrahtia–Zafrabad rail track will undergo doubling so as to increase traffic and speed between Lucknow and Varanasi.

=== Utrahtia junction terminal ===
If the passenger pressure continued to increase NR will create a terminal railway station at Utrahtia to ease rail traffic at Charbagh station. It will be sixth major railway station in city.
