= Krishna Nagar =

Krishna Nagar or Krishnanagar may refer to:

== Places ==
=== India ===
- Krishna Nagar, Delhi
  - Krishna Nagar metro station (Delhi)
  - Krishna Nagar (Delhi Assembly constituency)
- Krishna Nagar, Hyderabad
- Krishna Nagar, Lucknow
  - Krishna Nagar metro station (Lucknow)
- Krishnanagar, Karnataka
- Krishnanagar, Agartala, Tripura
- Krishnanagar, Hooghly, West Bengal
- Krishnanagar, Nadia, West Bengal
  - Krishnanagar Academy
  - Krishnanagar City Junction railway station
  - Krishnanagar I, community development block
  - Krishnanagar II, community development block
  - Krishnanagar Sadar subdivision
  - Krishnanagar Uttar Assembly constituency
  - Krishnanagar Dakshin Assembly constituency
  - Krishnanagar (Lok Sabha constituency)

=== Nepal ===
- Krishnanagar, Nepal

== People ==
- Krishna Nagar (para-badminton), Indian para-badminton player

== See also ==
- Krishna Nagar metro station (disambiguation)
- Krishan Nagar, Lahore, Punjab, Pakistan
