= National Gandhi Museum =

Museum in New Delhi, India

Coordinates: 29°04′28″N 77°24′58″E

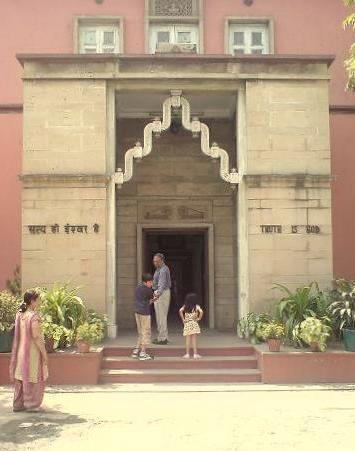
- Established: 1961
- Location: Raj Ghat, New Delhi, India
- Director: A. Annamalai
- Website: Official site

The National Gandhi Museum or Gandhi Memorial Museum is a museum located in New Delhi, India showcasing the life and principles of Mahatma Gandhi. The museum first opened in Mumbai, shortly after Gandhi's assassination in 1948. The museum relocated several times before moving to Raj Ghat, New Delhi in 1961. National Gandhi Museum opens on all Gazetted or public holidays except Holi and Diwali.

== History ==
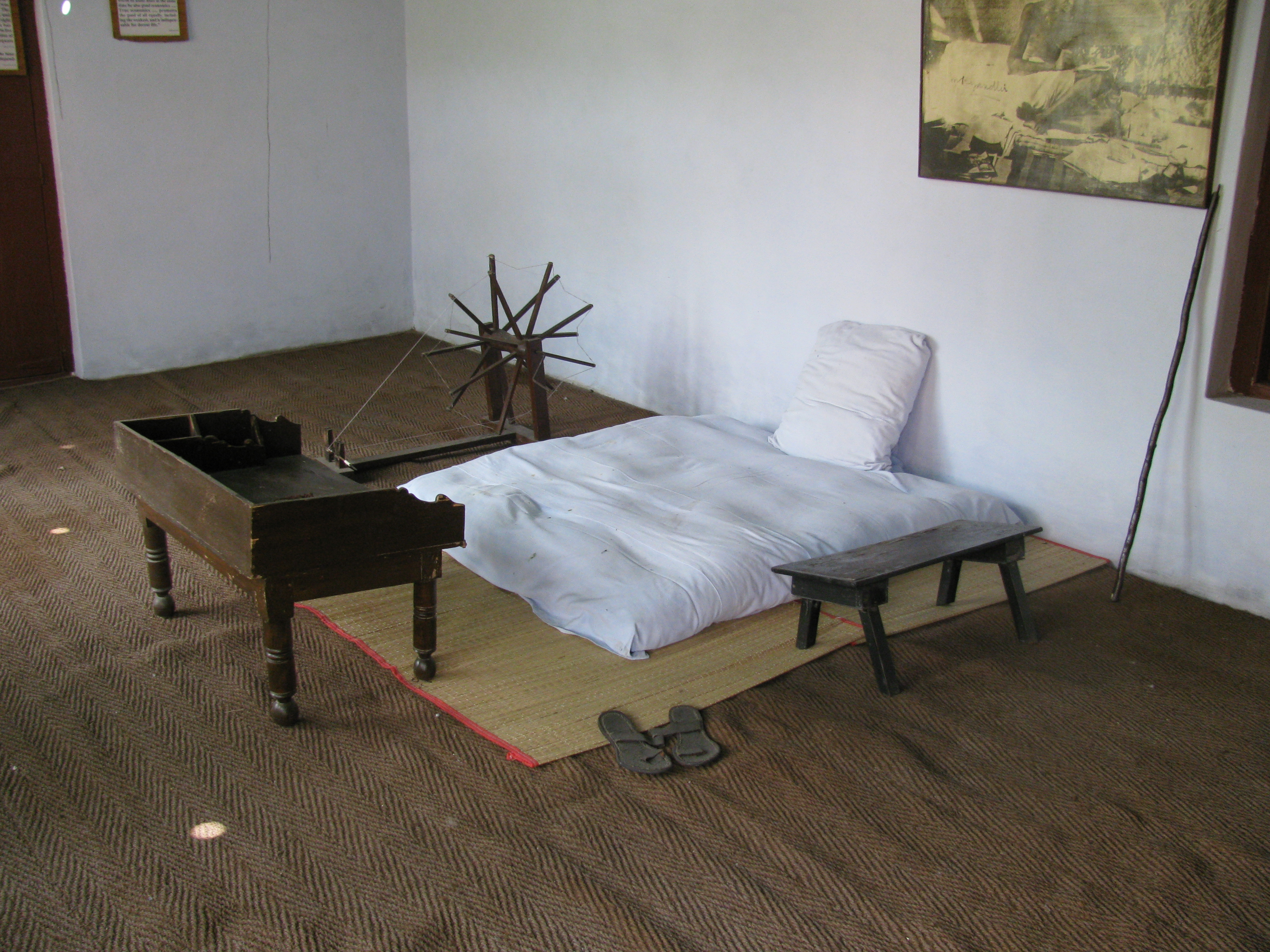
Reconstructed bedroom of Mahatma Gandhi, in the Museum

Mahatma Gandhi was assassinated on 30 January 1948. Shortly after his death, collectors began searching India for anything of importance about Gandhi. Originally the personal items, newspapers, and books related to Gandhi were taken to Mumbai. In 1951, the items were moved to buildings near the Kota House in New Delhi. The museum moved again in 1957 to a mansion.

In 1959, The Gandhi Museum moved for a final time to Rajghat, New Delhi next to the Samadhi of Mahatma Gandhi. The museum officially opened in 1961, on the 13th anniversary of Mahatma Gandhi's assassination, when Dr. Rajendra Prasad, then President of India, formally opened the new location.

== Library ==
This library at the Gandhi Museum plays a dual role of showcasing Gandhi's work to the public and also serving as a place for general study. The books are divided into two sections, those written by or about Gandhi and books on other subject matters. There are currently over 45,000 books or documents in the museum's library. The library also has a collection of 2,000 periodicals in both English and Hindi chronicling the life of Gandhi.

== Gallery ==
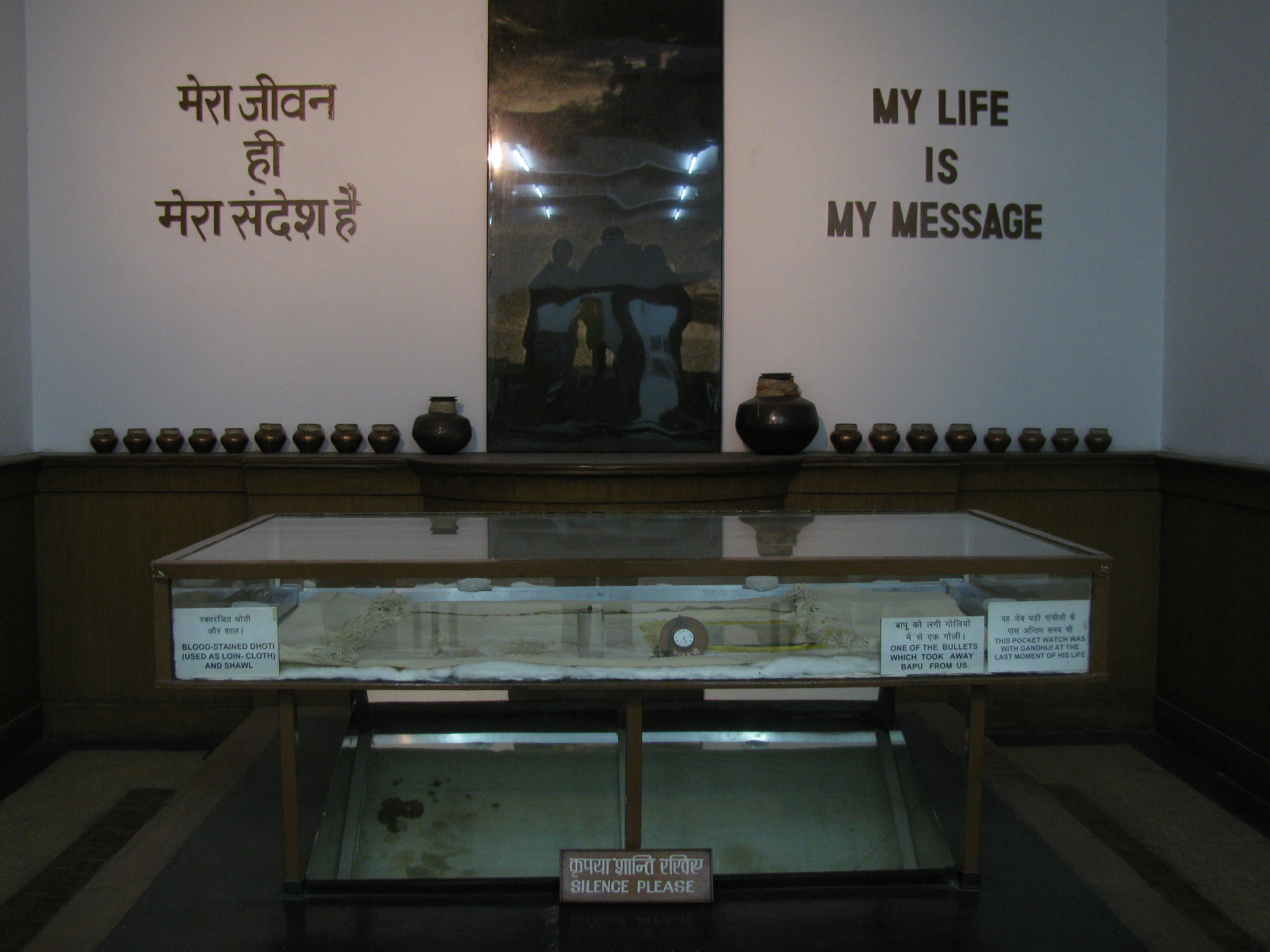
An exhibit showing blood-soaked loin cloth and shawl of Mahatma Gandhi, and the bullet that took his life.

The National Gandhi Museum Gallery has a large number of paintings and personal items of Mahatma Gandhi. The most notable items in the collection are a Satyagraha woodcut by Willemia Muller Ogterop, one of Gandhi's walking sticks, the shawl and dhoti worn by Gandhi when he was assassinated, one of the bullets that were used to kill Gandhi and his urn. The Museum also displays some of Gandhi's teeth and his ivory toothpick. Galleries of the museum are martyrdom gallery, commemorative gallery, art gallery where arts made on Gandhi is open for viewing. Museum also includes a general photo gallery.

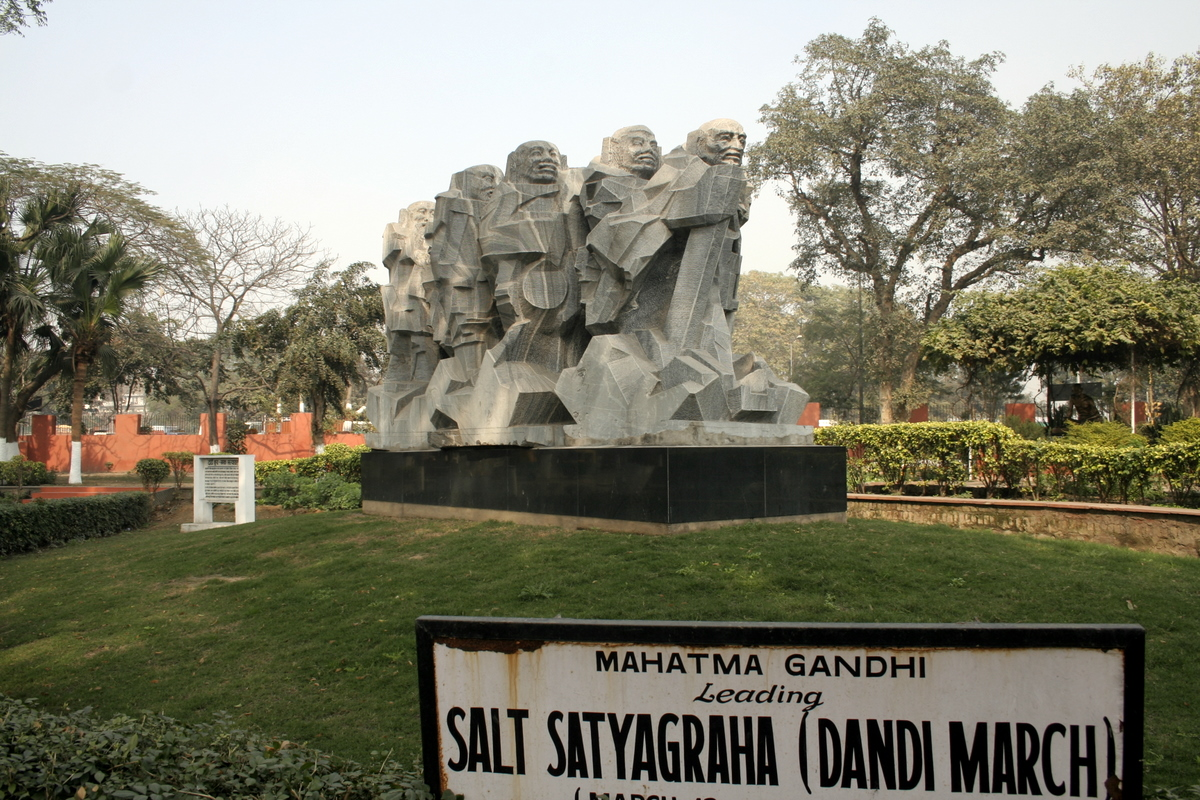
Sculpture of Gandhiji Leading Salt satyagraha

== Special exhibitions ==
In addition to the museum's Gandhi based permanent collection, the museum also showcases other exhibits mainly dealing with the history of India. Most exhibits are based on Indian political leaders, and peace movements, though major world events also have collections.

== See also ==
- Eternal Gandhi Multimedia Museum
- Gandhi Smriti (Birla House)
- Gandhi Memorial Museum at Madurai
