= Ranjit Makkuni =

Indian multimedia artist and designer

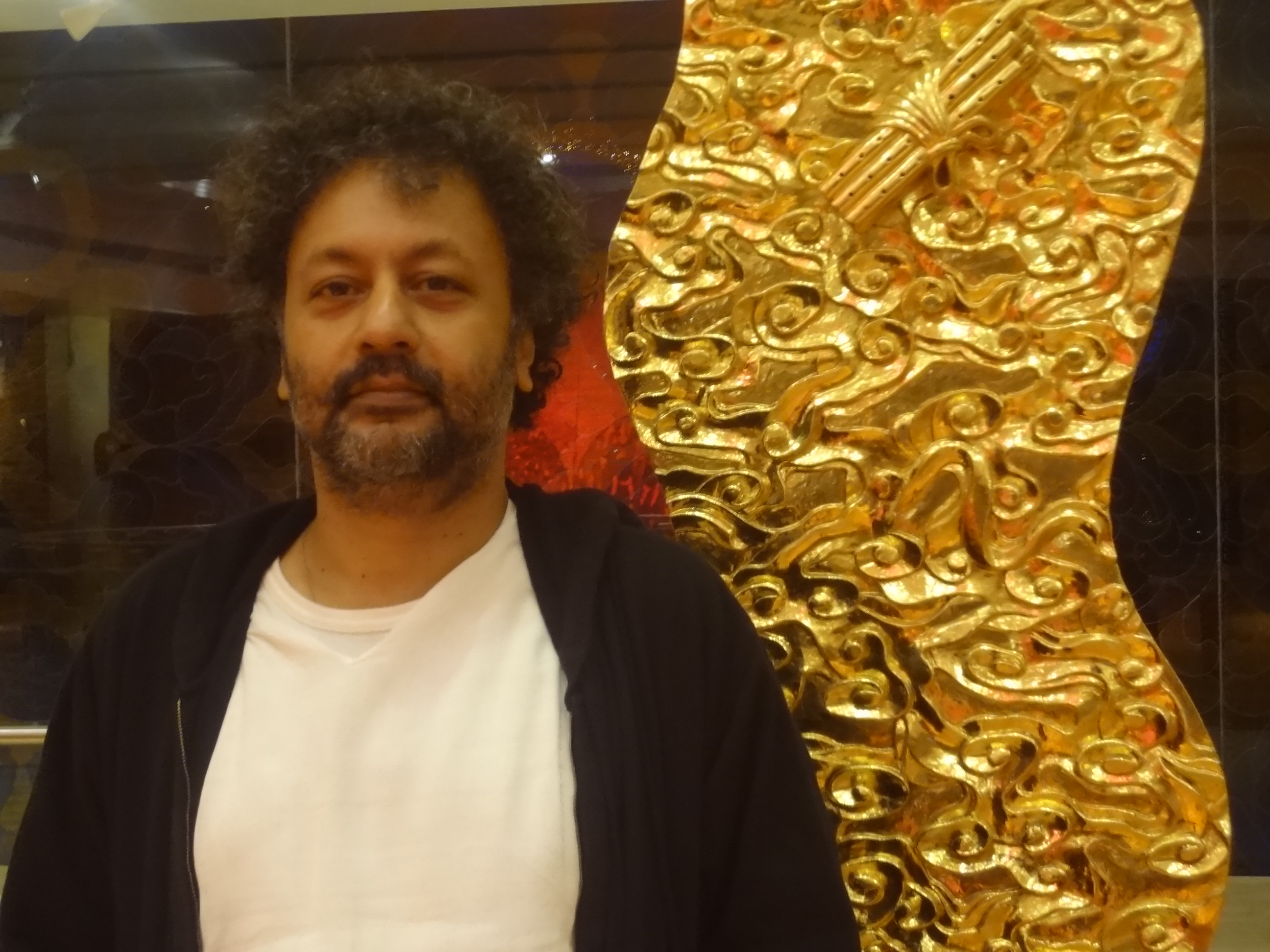
- Ranjit Makkuni in front of his Flute Tree sculpture (2011)
- Education: IIT Kharagpur
- Alma mater: University of California, Los Angeles

Ranjit Makkuni is an international multimedia artist and designer, the honorary director of the design think tank, the Sacred World Research Laboratory, as well as a musician, sitar player, songwriter, and author.

His multimedia museum works are intersections between traditional and modern art, design and technology, such that the results help both traditional and modern cultures. They are intended to show that the wisdom of traditional communities can positively negate the homogenizing influences of modern technology; and that the intelligence, creativity and sense of freedom afforded by modern design and technology can reciprocally help traditional artists.

His major works are several museum projects: Eternal Gandhi Multimedia Museum, Planet Health Museum, The Goddess and Temples of Music, and The Crossing: Living, Dying and Transformation in Banaras.

== Education and research ==
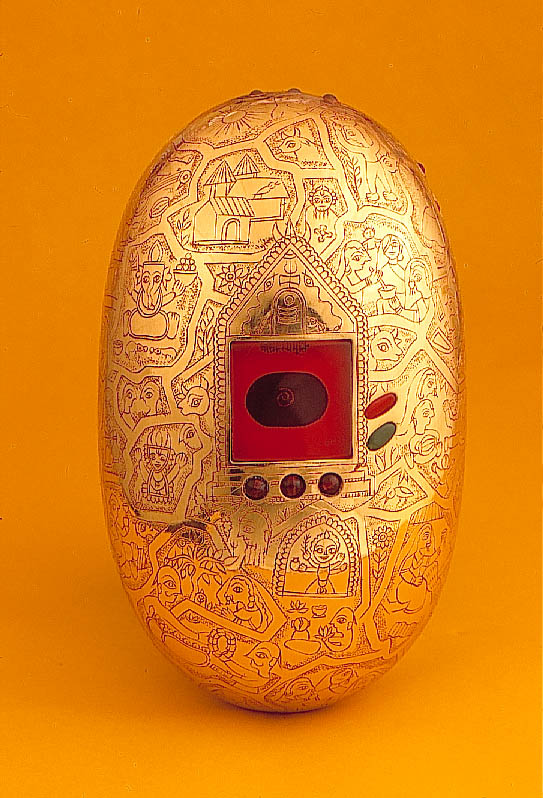
E Egg from the Crossing Project, a culturally personalized wireless information retrieval device, 1999

Makkuni obtained a B.Arch. from IIT Kharagpur, and a Masters in Design Theory and Methods from University of California, Los Angeles (UCLA). He has been a scientific consultant to HP Labs Palo Alto, HP Labs Bangalore, and a member of the Explorer's club of the Ivrea Institute of Design, Ivrea, Italy. He is a member of the mentoring group of Nehru Memorial Museum, New Delhi, constituted by the Prime Minister of India.

== Works done at Xerox Palo Alto Research Center ==
In 1985, Makkuni joined the System Concepts Lab of PARC, becoming part of the group which developed the object-oriented programming language Smalltalk-80 and the world's first graphical user interface. From that base, Makkuni pioneered explorations in computer-aided design (CAD), gesture recognition interfaces, and multimedia applications to develop the Active Learning Project at PARC. These have been demonstrated as museum exhibitions in the US, India, Europe and Thailand (see Bibliography – Exhibitions below), transforming people's perceptions of traditional cultures, and presenting an Asian approach to interaction with computing technology.

In 1989, The Electronic Sketchbook of Tibetan Thangka Painting was displayed in the Asian Art Museum of San Francisco. This project represents one of the world's first multimedia applications of any kind and a pioneering example of a computer based cultural learning tool.

During 1994–1997, he worked with scholars at the Indira Gandhi National Centre for the Arts, New Delhi, to develop the Gita-Govinda Multimedia Experience, a pioneering demonstration of a physical-virtual multimedia document based on the poet Jayadeva’s 12th century love poem, the Gita Govinda. This project brought the footprints of multimedia computing technology to India.

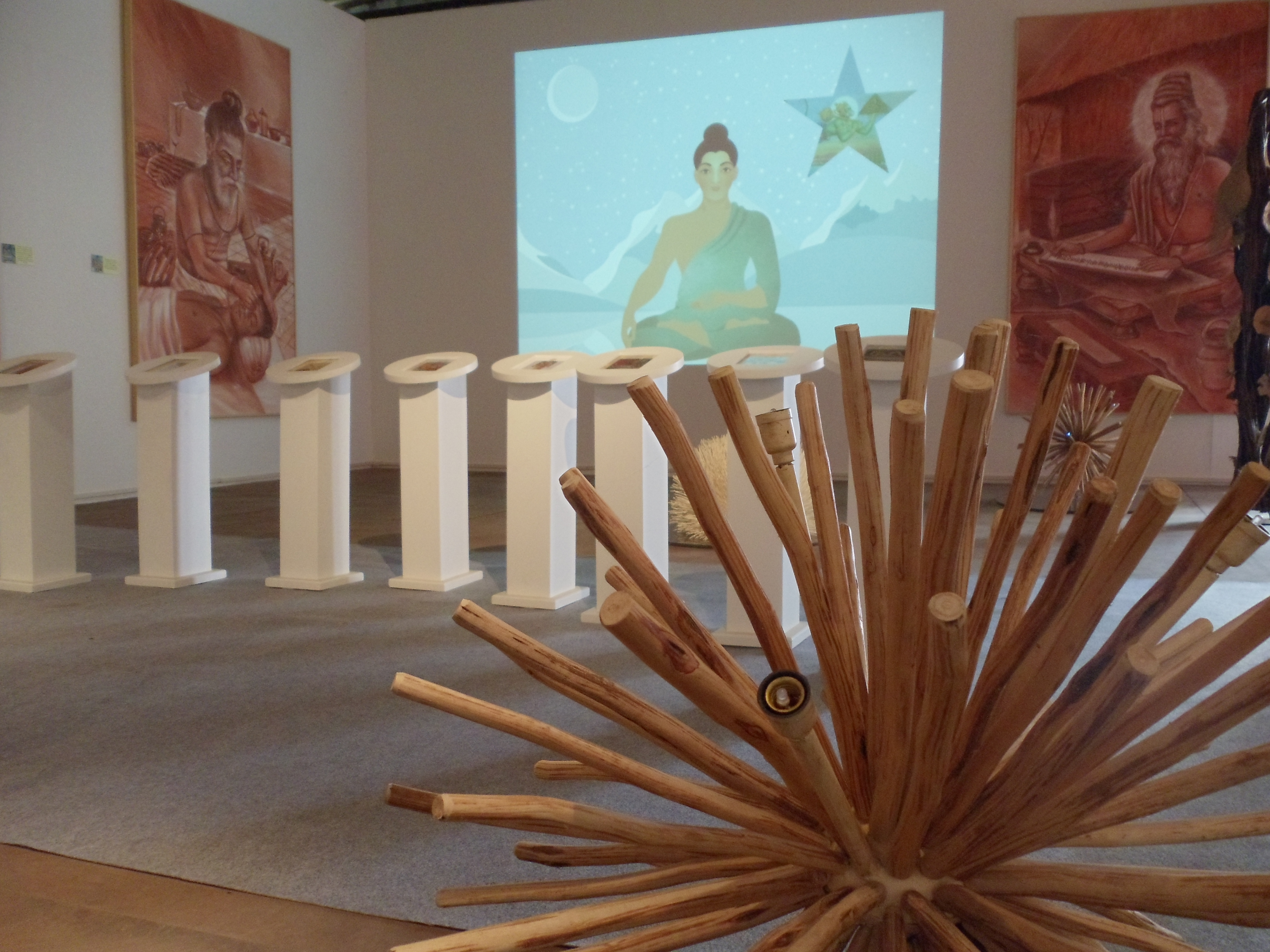
The Ayurveda Story installation, Planet Health Museum, 2010

== Works done at Sacred World Research Laboratory ==
From 1998 until 2002, Makkuni conceived and directed The Crossing Project: Living, Dying, and Transformation in Banaras which developed a panorama of digital information access devices and technologies personalized by the cultural traditions of Banaras. The project brought together Western Information Access Knowledge systems and Indian notions of 'connection' and interaction based on India's city of Knowledge, Banaras. The project was a pioneering demonstration of physical computing, and culturally personalized computing hardware and interactions.

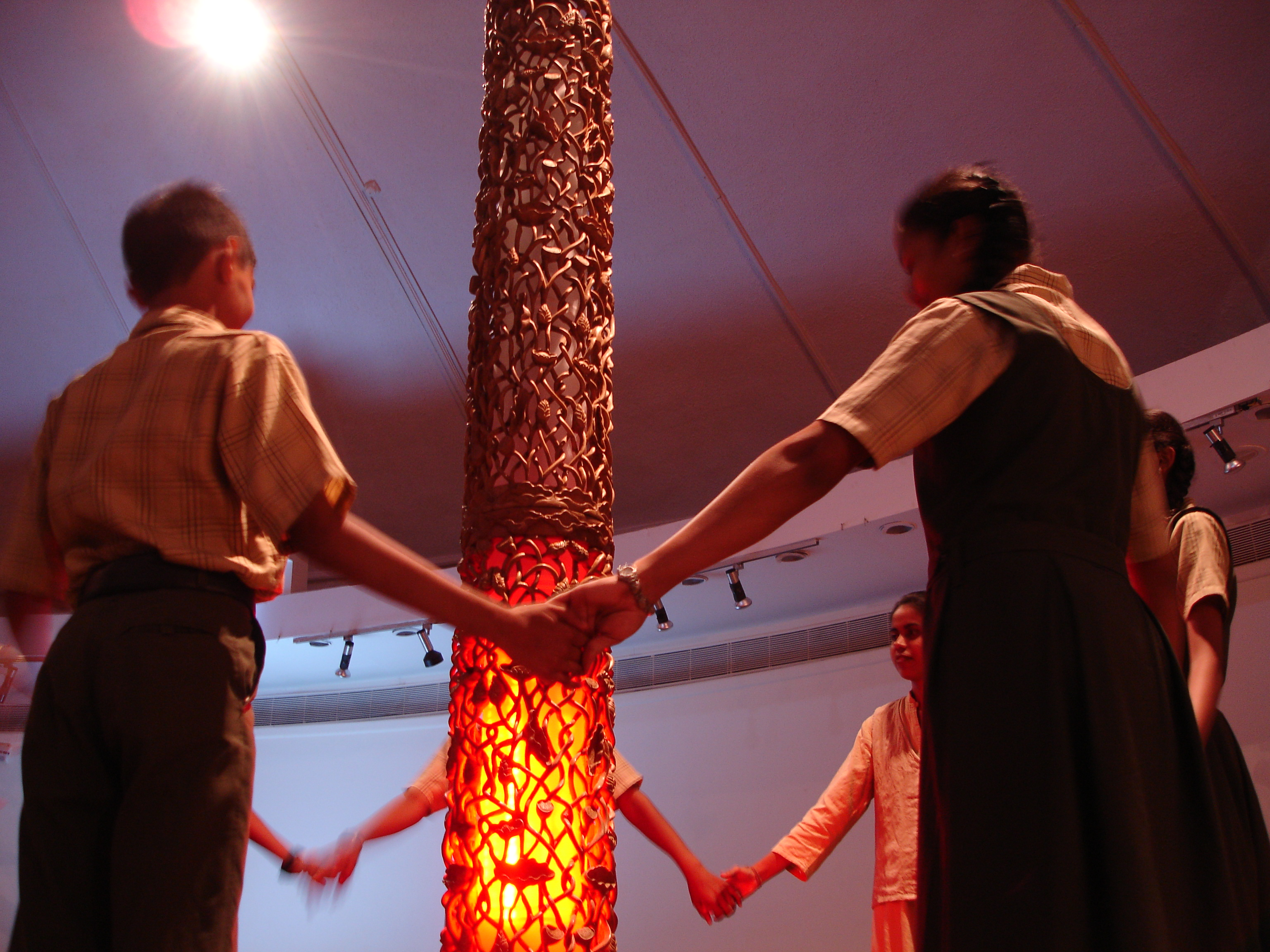
People hold hands to light up the Unity Pillar, Eternal Gandhi Multimedia Museum, 2006

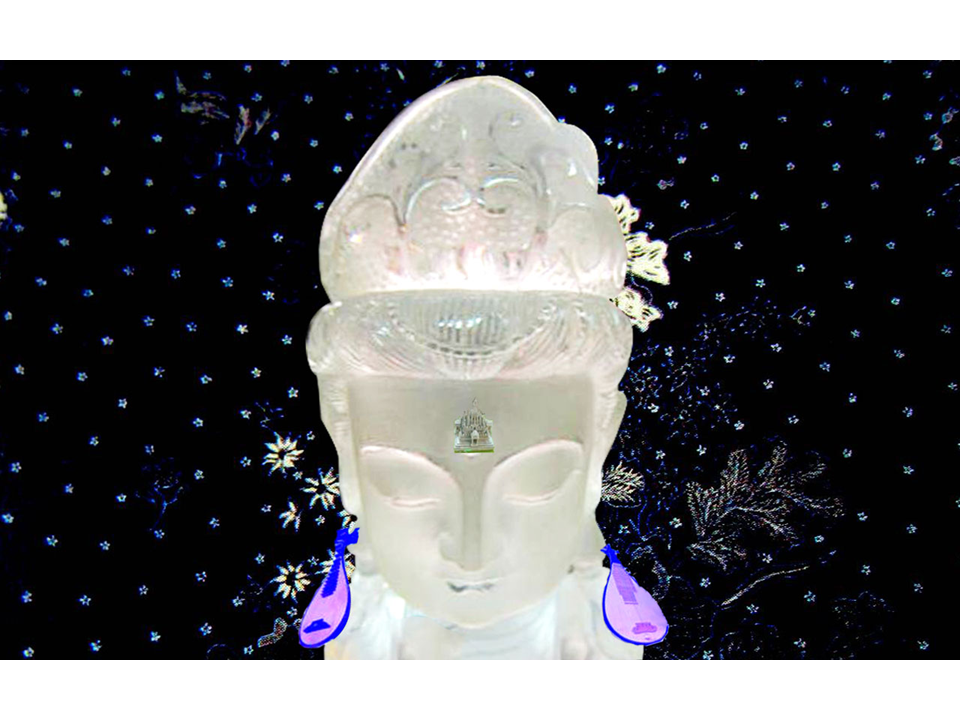
Goddess and Temples of Music 2012

From 2003 until 2005, Makkuni visualized and directed the Eternal Gandhi Multimedia Museum, New Delhi, one of the world's first digital multimedia museums. Located at the site where Mahatma Gandhi attained martyrdom, the museum preserves the historical events of Gandhiji's life in digital form but also presents a spectrum of information technology visions inspired by Gandhian thought. The project revives the values by which India obtained freedom; it also redefines those values in order to animate modern products and design. Through a collection of over 50 originally designed works of technology and art, the project interpreted Gandhian thought in the design of new technology and illustrated how village aesthetics and creativity can shape modern design.

In 2010, Makkuni built the Planet Health Museum, an interactive museum that allows people to access traditional Green philosophy and the concept and experience of health from the perspectives of Ayurveda and Yoga. Starting from the concept of health and Indian perspectives of the body, the project illustrated new visions and tools for a healthy society and planet. The project presents this vision across a spectrum of disciplines using many forms of visual and performing arts, ancient sciences and modern interaction design to communicate the vision. Planet Health Museum has also been studied for its use of interactive art as educational device.

Makkuni's 2012 exhibition, The Goddess and Temples of Music project puts forth a vision of the beauty and spirituality of the feminine, and hopes to inspire in people respect for Woman, based on the world's Goddess traditions. Using the forms of musical instruments and music as a tool to unravel the language of the sacred feminine, the project transforms Modern Man's perceptions, illustrating possibilities for a positive, compassionate, sustainable way of life.

The project presents both traditional and new instruments based on Indian veena-based instruments, sitar, Burmese harp, Thai xylophone, Korean kayagum, and Javanese and Balinese gamelan. New instruments with embedded computation demonstrate tactile computing, i.e., interaction with computers through gesture and kinaesthetic action. In addition, through responsive computing, people by their position, gesture, and movements control musical events in the environment.

In 2013, Makkuni launched Musical Landscapes and the Goddesses of Music at the National Museum, New Delhi. This exhibition explores the science, art and spirituality of Music, and its reflections in the Goddess images across Asian cultures. An expanded version titled Music and Goddess was presented in 2014 at the National Gallery of Modern Art, Mumbai.

Installation view, Musical Landscapes and the Goddesses of Music, 2013

== Design for a Compassionate Web ==
In 2018, Makkuni was invited by Professor Alfredo Ronchi to participate in the WSIS conference, Geneva, panel on Cybersecurity. Through his presentation titled, "The Betrayal of the IT Revolution," he was one of the first to show how the benefits of information access to the web had been negated by the IT nightmare which has had deep impacts on the society at levels of connection, health, psychological wellbeing, and hence, deep questions to privacy and fundamental freedoms and 'Truth' are awaiting answers. The presentation also showed how developing nations feel shortchanged by the IT revolution because they have traded investments in ecological resources and traditional social capital (in terms of harmonious communities and ecosystems), for the promise of a 'smartness' revolution that has never delivered.

This topic has been the subject of many of his songwriting endeavors through the Jazz, Rock band "Mahamaya Experience."

In two follow ons to the 2018 WSIS conference, the 2022 conference explored the topic of Digital Entrapment, and the 2023 WSIS conference asked the question as to whether Digital Tech was resilient or green?

== Health, Wellbeing and an Abundant Mother Earth ==
In a follow up to the WSIS 2018 presentation, Makkuni argued for the Freedom from Digital Entrapment at the WSIS 2022 forum. In the forum he campaigned for the design of a humanized technology, at the levels of user interfaces and device design, web architecture and media design, with the goal of creating health & wellbeing for technology users. With the impacts that globalization economics and IT have had on the environment in developing economies, he presented a vision that will allow mankind to become rooted in the commitment to ecological awareness, potentially leaving future generations with an 'abundant Mother Earth', especially as the world today lies at the cusp of irreversible environmental degradation.

== Reclaiming humanity in the digital age ==
In Makkuni’s 2025 work, “Mahamaya Reflections,” he explores the concept of Mahamaya—the grand illusion that veils true reality—and its relevance in today’s hyper-connected, digitized world. In this book, and in his address at WSIS 2025, Makkuni argues that while digital technology promised liberation and connection, it has instead contributed to social fragmentation, anxiety, and ecological crisis. He contends that the seductive illusion of technological progress—Mahamaya—blinds society to the erosion of empathy, creativity, and our vital connection to nature. Through the work, Makkuni offers both philosophical insight and guidance for reclaiming the world's humanity in the digital age, advocating a “Human, Humane, and Humanity First” approach that emphasizes the restoration of compassion, mindfulness, and authentic connection amidst rapid technological advancement.

== Awards ==
- Co-recipient of the Mahavir Mahatma award 2005, India for the propagation of peace.
- Asian Cultural Council fellowship, New York, 2003.
- Ars Electronica award for Interactive art, Linz, 2002.
- Japan Media Arts Festival, 2002.
- ID Magazine award, New York, 1998.
- ID Magazine award, New York, 2002.
- ID Magazine award, New York, 2005.
- Nomination for National Award for Design, USA, 2012.
- A award, Italy, 2012.
- A award, Italy, Cultural Heritage and Culture Industry Design Award for 2013 – 2014, 2014.

== Bibliography – books ==
- Banaras: The Crossing. Living, Dying and Transformation in Banaras, 2003, Co authored with Dr. Madhu Khanna.
- Eternal Gandhi Multimedia Museum, design of the museum, 2007.
- Music and Goddess, 2014.
- World as Woman, 2024.

== Bibliography – museums ==
- Planet Health Museum, Sacred World Research Laboratory, New Delhi, 2010.
- Eternal Gandhi Multimedia Museum, Sacred World Research Laboratory, Gandhi Smriti and Darshan Samiti, New Delhi, 2005.

== Bibliography – exhibitions ==
- Music and Goddesses, National Gallery of Modern Art, Mumbai, 2014.
- Musical Landscapes and the Goddesses of Music, National Museum, New Delhi, 2013.
- Goddess and her Temples of Music, National Museum, New Delhi, 2013.
- So Many Minds II, Contributing artist, CMU art museum, Thailand, 2013.
- New India Designscape, Contributing artist, Triennale Design Museum, Milan, 2012.
- So Many Minds I, Contributing artist, CMU art museum, Thailand, 2011.
- Sacred Touch, Winter Olympics, Vancouver, Canada, 2010.
- Eternal Gandhi, Technology Center, Jaipur, 2008.
- Eternal Gandhi, Science City, Ahmadabad, 2007.
- Eternal Gandhi, International Convention Centre, Pune, 2006.
- Eternal Gandhi, Prince of Wales Museum, Mumbai, 2006.
- Eternal Gandhi, National Gallery of Modern Art, Mumbai, 2006.

- Secrets of Shiva, National Gallery, Bangkok, 2006.
- The Crossing Project: Living, Dying and Transformation in Banaras, OK Center for the Arts, Linz, 2002.
- The Crossing Project: Living, Dying and Transformation in Banaras, Asia Society, New York, 2002.
- The Crossing Project: Living, Dying and Transformation in Banaras, National Gallery of Modern Art, Mumbai, 2002.
- The Crossing Project: Living, Dying and Transformation in Banaras, India Habitat Centre, New Delhi. 2001.
- Gita-Govinda Multimedia Experience, Indira Gandhi National Center for the Arts, New Delhi, 1997.
- Electronic Sketch Book of Tibetan Thangka Painting, Asian Art Museum, San Francisco, 1989.

Raga Malkauns
2000, Sitar Jhalla, Raga Malkauns, Ranjit Makkuni & Mithilesh Jha

Raga Bag Bhim
2012, Raga Bag Bhim, Ranjit Makkuni & Mithilesh Jha

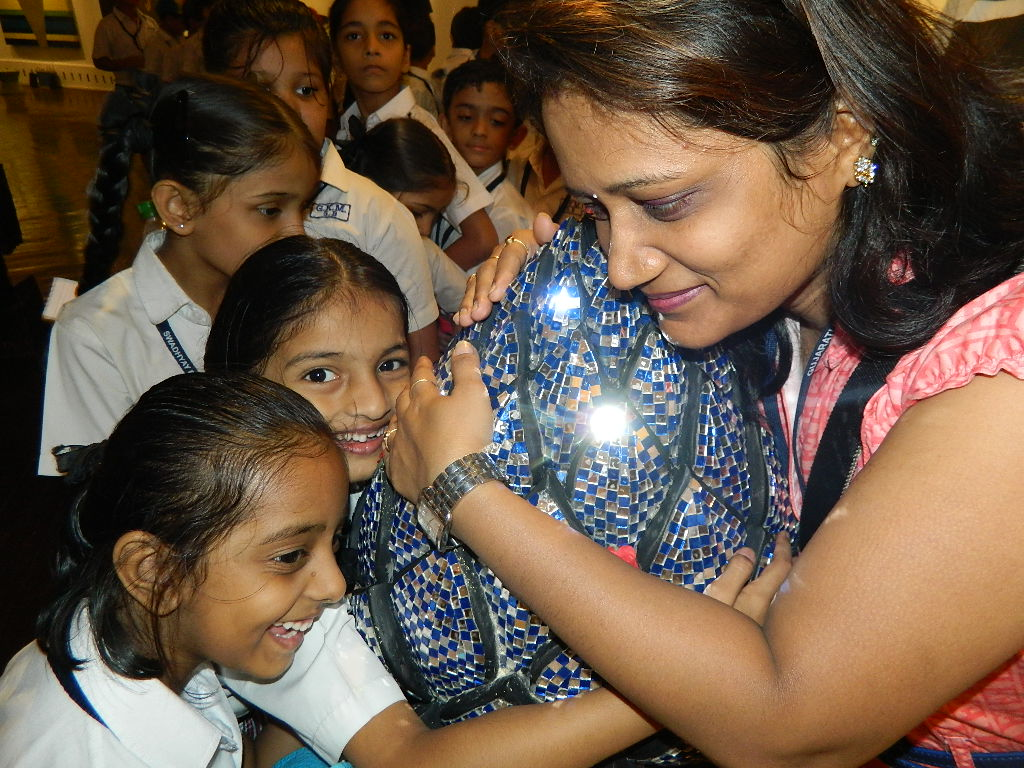
Children hug the 'calm lotus' sculpture to hear musical passages that create calm, 2014

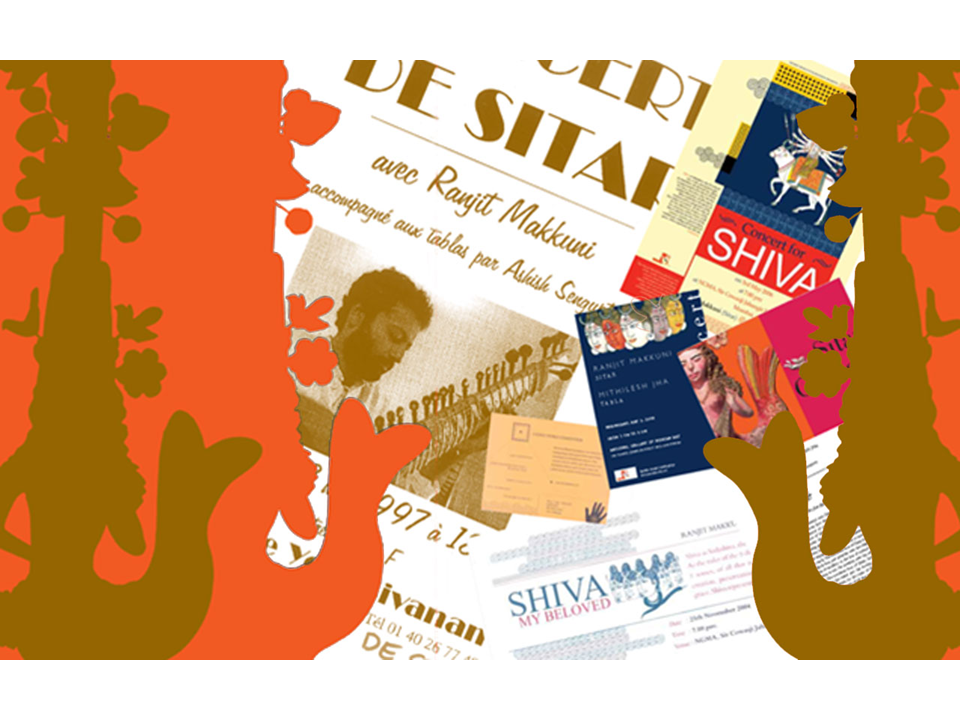
Ranjit Makkuni, sitar player

== Sitar music ==
Makkuni studied sitar under the tutelage of ustad Ali Akbar Khan, and carries jewels of composition from bygone eras.

== Mahamaya Jazz Rock project (2015-present) ==
The Mahamaya Experience, Mahamaya for short, presents a set of experimental musical works created by Ranjit during 2015 till present. The instrumental works span a variety of diverse musical genres that includes classical Asian music, Indian and South East Asian and East Asian scales executed through predominantly string instruments including sitar, guitars, and world music rhythms. The songs span expression in the genres of Opera, Funk, Rock, Pop rock and Classical Asian genres.

The songs of the Mahamaya Experience address themes of illusion, spirituality, and the need for ecological and cultural renewal. Tracks like “Village Songs” have been highlighted for their powerful commentary on rejecting consumerism and embracing sustainable, traditional ways of life, with reviewers noting its “powerful message” about the value of environmental and cultural heritage. Other reviews of the Mahamaya Experience’s music praise the band’s ability to blend contemporary musical elements with traditional sounds, producing pieces that are “gorgeous and drawn out, gentle and drifting, focused yet wonderfully and wilfully meandering.” Specific reviews of “Postpone My Nirvana,” and “Butterfly Sitar Jam” emphasize the group’s approach to world music, their mission to inspire reflection and healing, and their celebration of diversity and unity through a musical journey that bridges tradition and modernity.
