= Eternal Gandhi Multimedia Museum =

Coordinates: 28°36′06.7″N 77°12′51.6″E

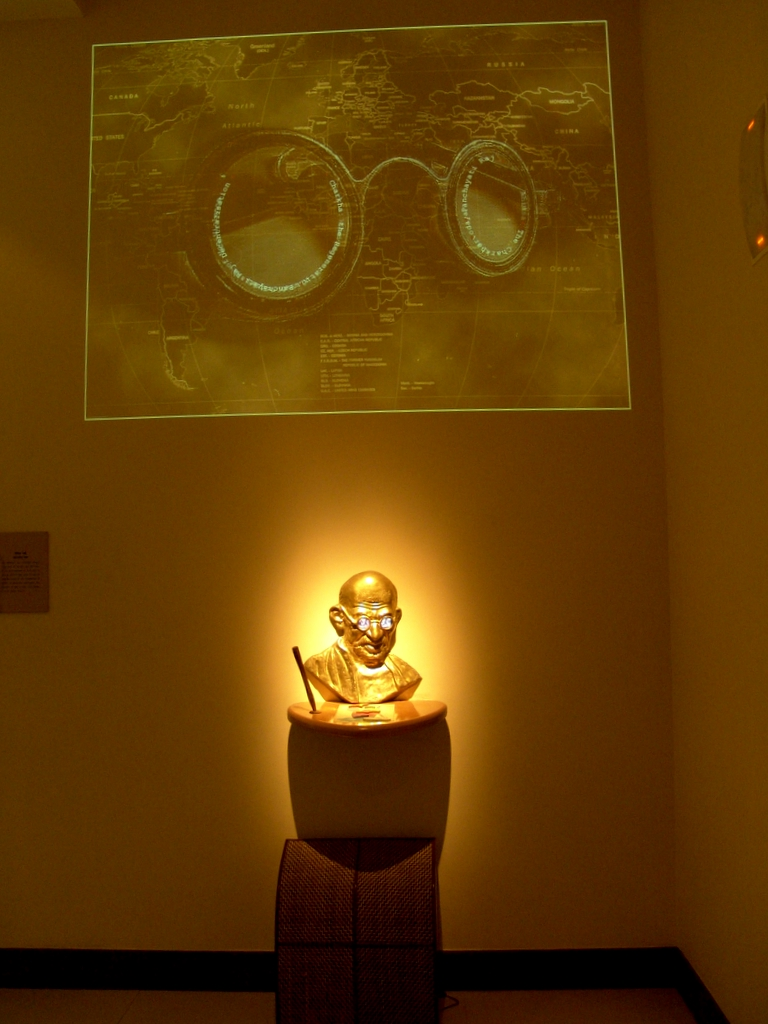
Gandhiji' Vision an exhibit, at Eternal Gandhi Multimedia Museum

The Eternal Gandhi Multimedia Museum is a digital multimedia museum established in 2005. It is located at Gandhi Smriti, formerly Birla House, the site where Mohandas Karamchand Gandhi was assassinated. The museum presents historical records of Gandhi's life, and aims to revive and redefine the values by which India obtained freedom.

== History ==
The project is an initiative of the Aditya Birla Group and Gandhi Smriti Darshan Samiti. It is supported by Grasim and Hindalco, and developed by the Sacred World Research Laboratory. The museum was inaugurated on 14 April 2005 by Indian Prime Minister Manmohan Singh.

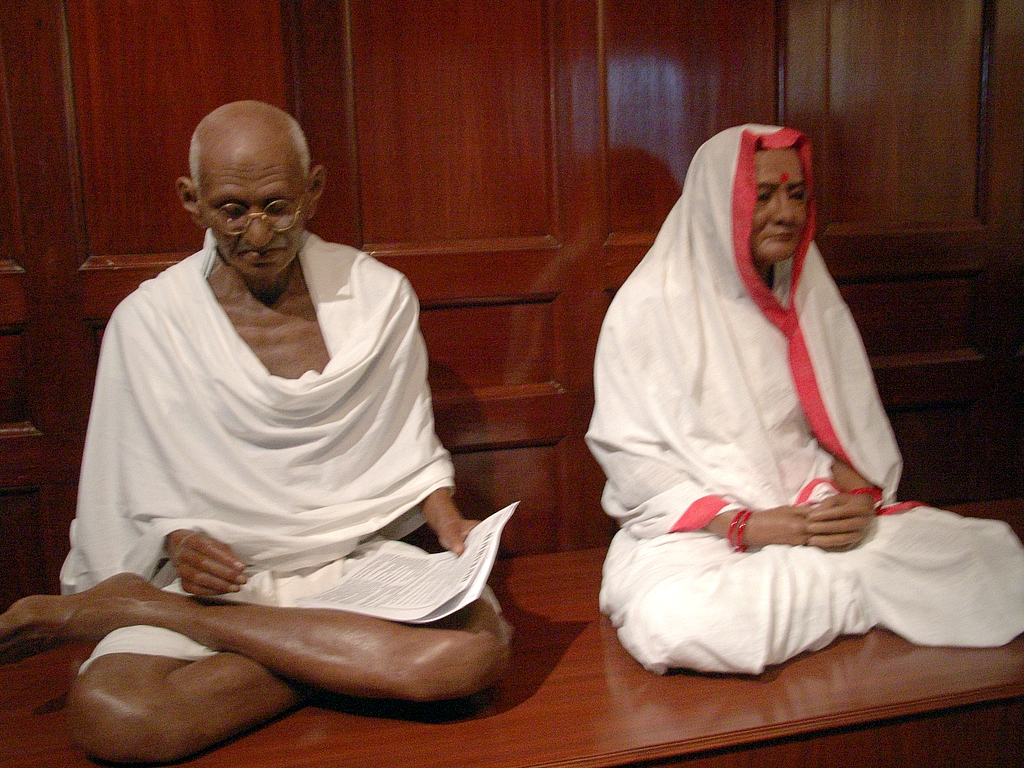
Statues of Mohandas K. and Kasturba Gandhi at Eternal Gandhi Multimedia Museum

The exhibition includes displays derived from classical Indian symbols such as the spinning wheel, turning prayer wheels, touching symbolic pillars, the act of hands touching sacred objects, and collaboratively constructed quilts. It embellishes the life of Gandhi in rhythmic with photographs, paintings, film footage, and video clips. A collection of over 40 exhibits shows the intersection of modern tactile computing and new green art with Gandhi's vision.

The exhibits were designed by Ranjit Makkuni, who directed a team of over 200 artists, scientists, and craftspeople, and obtained the contribution of leading scholars and institutions from all over the world.

The Project won the ID Magazine New York award for its design contributions.

A mobile version of the museum travels to different states of the country and abroad.

== Gallery ==
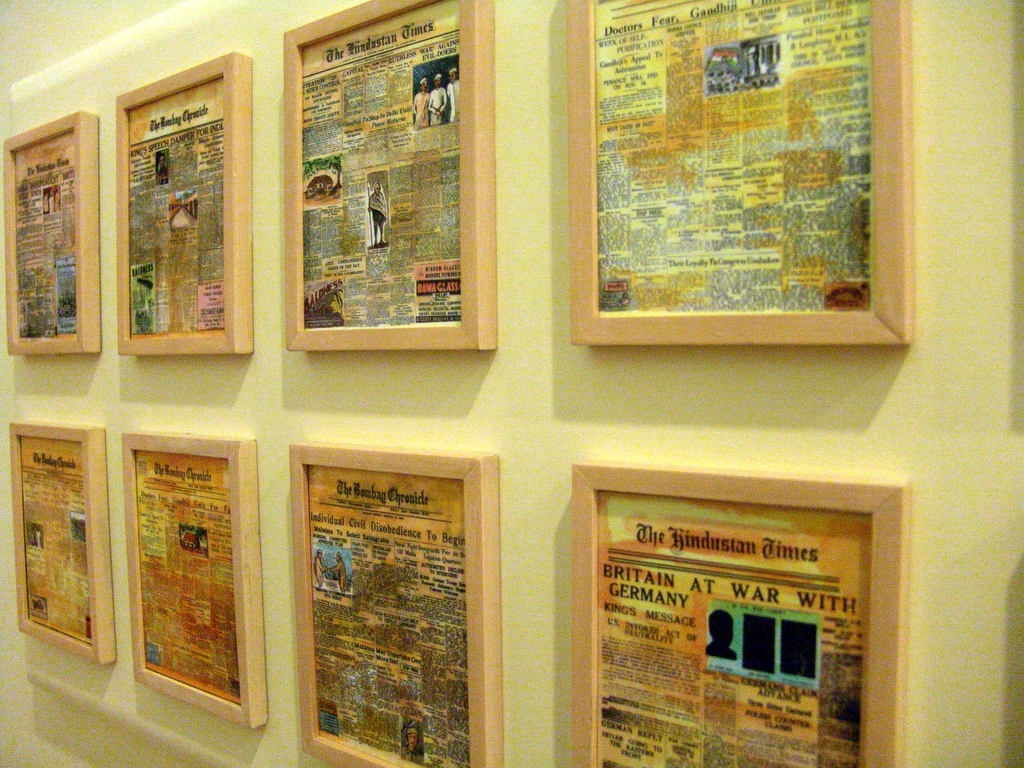
A newspaper clippings exhibit

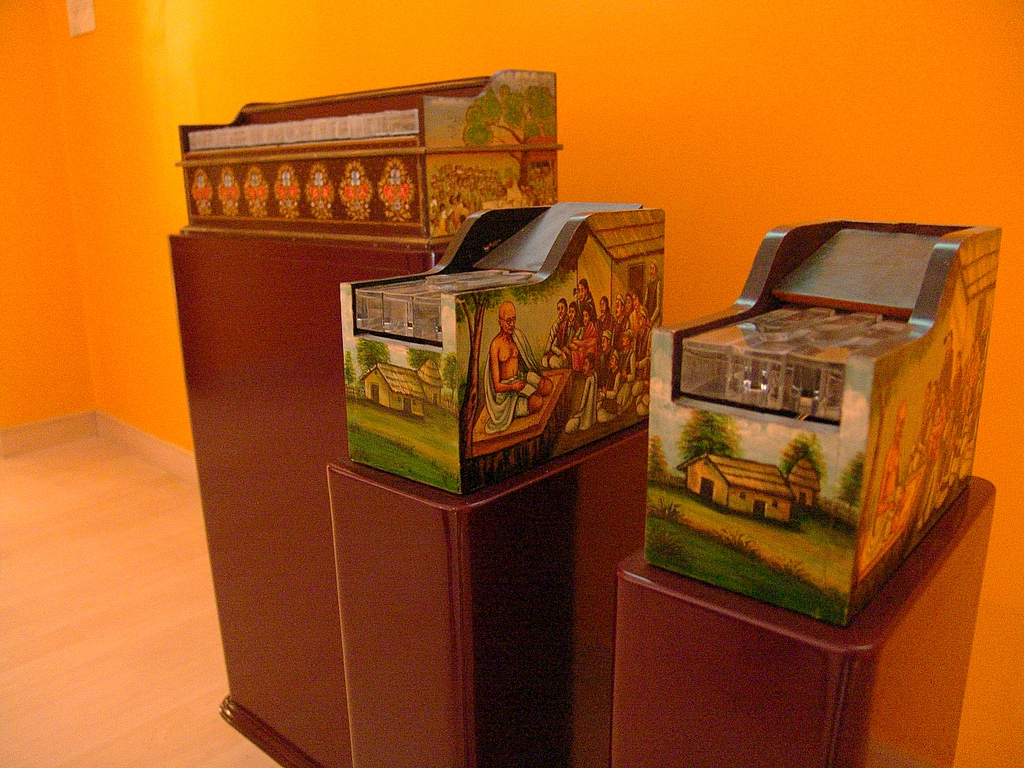
E-Harmonium

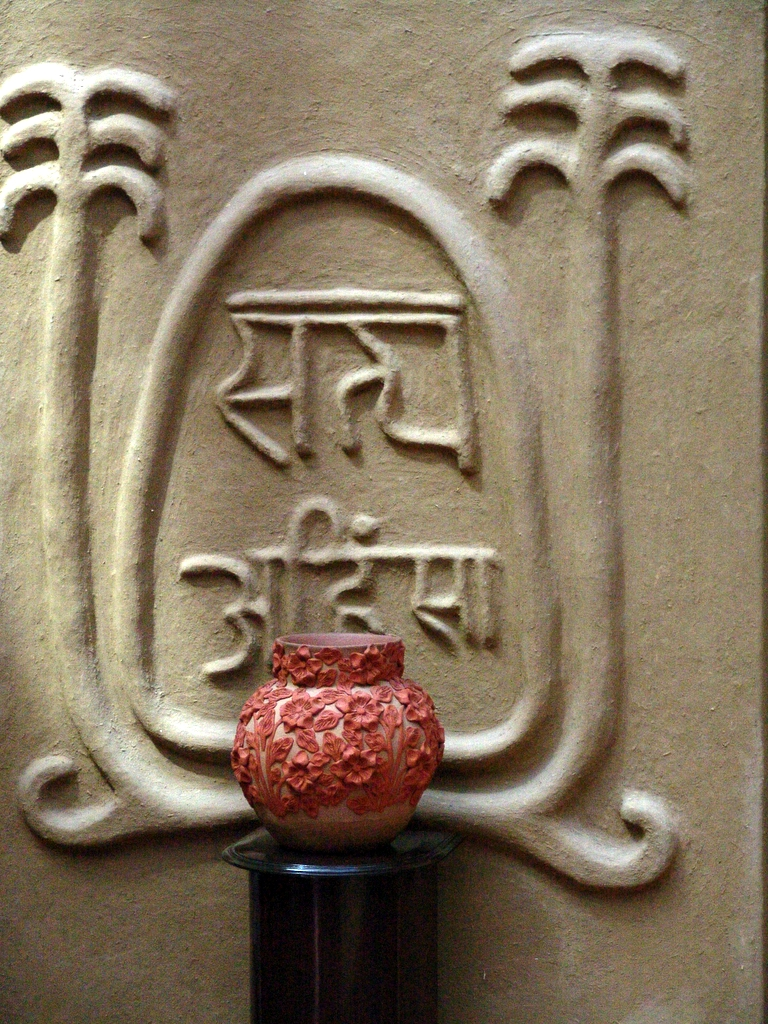
An exhibit at the museum

== See also ==
- National Gandhi Museum
- Gandhi Memorial Museum, Madurai
- Sabarmati Ashram
