= Kushtia District (1947–1984) =

Kushtia District (1947-1984) কুষ্টিয়া জিলা (১৯৪৭-১৯৮৪)
- 1947–1984
- Undivided Kushtia District on the map of Bangladesh
- Capital and largest city: Kushtia town
- Official languages: Bengali, English, Urdu (till 1971)
- Religion: Islam (majority); Hinduism (minority)
- Demonym: Kushtiayi
- Postal code
- Legislature: East Bengal Legislative Assembly; Jatiya Sangsad after 1971
- Historical era: East Bengal, East Pakistan; Bangladesh before 1984
  - Founded: 1947
  - Disestablished: 1984

Area
  - Total: 3,495.75 km^{2} (1,349.72 sq mi)

Population
  - 1981 estimate: 2291997
  - 1981 census: 1981
  - Density: 656/km^{2} (1,699.0/sq mi)
Preceded by
Nadia District (1787-1947)
Succeeded by
Kushtia District
Meherpur District
Chuadanga District
- Today part of: Bangladesh

Undivided Kushtia District (Bengali: অবিভক্ত কুষ্টিয়া জেলা) or Greater Kushtia District (Bengali: বৃহত্তর কুষ্টিয়া জেলা) or Pakistani Nadia District (Bengali: পাকিস্তানি নদীয়া জেলা) was a district consisting of Kushtia Sub-Division, Meherpur Sub-Division and Chuadanga Sub-Division of Greater Nadia District separated from Nadia District during the creation of East Bengal in 1947.

== History ==
In 1725, the region of Kushtia was under the Zamindars of Natore. Later the British East India Company included Kushtia in Jessore District in 1776. But in 1828, it was included in Pabna District. In 1861, Kushtia Sub-Division was established due to Indigo revolt and in 1871, Kushtia Sub-Division with Kumarkhali Upazila and Khoksa Upazila was included in Nadia District. Pre-independence Nadia had five subdivisions: Krishnagar sadar, Ranaghat, Kushtia, Meherpur and Chuadanga. Due to some cartographic error in 1947, large part of Nadia except Nabadwip initially were included into East Bengal, Pakistan (now Bangladesh) due to it being a Muslim majority district in the 1941 census of British India. Due to protests rectification was made and on the night of 17 August 1947, Ranaghat, Krishnanagar, Shikarpur in Karimpur and Plassey were placed in West Bengal, India as Nabadwip district and the district in East Bengal was formed as Nadia district. It was then consisted of 3 subdivisions. These are Kushtia, Meherpur (except Karimpur and Tehatta thana) and Chuadanga (except Krishnaganj thana). In October 1947, Nadia District Magistrate Syed Murtaza Ali changed the name of the district to Kushtia District from Nadia to avoid confusion. Then in 1984, after 13 years of the independence of Bangladesh, Chuadanga and Meherpur districts were separated as separate districts and the present Kushtia district was formed with 6 police stations.

== Administrative division ==
Undivided Kushtia district had 03 subdivisions and 12 thanas.

Subdivision	no.	Upazila	Current district
Kushtia	01	Kushtia Sadar Thana	Kushtia District
Kushtia	02	Kumarkhali Thana	Kushtia District
Kushtia	03	Khoksa Thana	Kushtia District
Kushtia	04	Mirpur Thana	Kushtia District
Kushtia	05	Bheramara Thana	Kushtia District
Kushtia	06	Daulatpur Thana	Kushtia District
Meherpur	07	Meherpur Thana	Meherpur District
Meherpur	08	Gangni Thana	Meherpur District
Chuadanga	09	Chuadanga Thana	Chuadanga District
Chuadanga	10	Alamdanga Thana	Chuadanga District
Chuadanga	11	Damurhuda Thana	Chuadanga District
Chuadanga	12	Jibannagar Thana	Chuadanga District

== Demographics ==
According to 1981 census, total population of Kushtia district was 2291997. Muslim formed the largest community.

Religion in Kushtia District (1981)
Islam	95.11%
Hinduism	4.48%
Christianity	0.40%
Other or not stated	0.01%

== In the present time ==
Mujibnagar in Undivided Kushtia District was the first temporary capital of independent Bangladesh which is now an upazila in Meherpur District. The Bengali spoken by the original inhabitants of this region i.e. the undivided Nadia district bears a close resemblance to modern Standard Bengali. The larger society of the inhabitants of these three districts is called the Brihottoro Kushtiabasi.

== See Also ==
- Nadia District (1787-1947)
- Kushtia District
- Meherpur District
- Chuadanga District
