= Krishna Nagar, Lucknow =

Krishna Nagar
- Residential Area
- Interactive map of Krishna Nagar
- Coordinates: 26.7965°N 80.8867°E
- Country: India
- State: Uttar Pradesh

Population
  - Total: 20,000

Languages
  - Official: Hindi
- Time zone: UTC+5:30 (IST)
- PIN: 226023
- Vehicle registration: UP 32
- Rapid Transit access: Krishna Nagar

Krishna Nagar is a residential area in the city of Lucknow. It is located to the south of Sharda Canal and west of Kanpur Road. It has a police station which is under the control of the Lucknow Police.

== Geography ==
Next to the Krishna Nagar metro station is a college called Lucknow Polytechnic, which is semi-governmental.

Krishna Nagar has various parks, like the traffic training park (Yaata Yaat Park), Shaakha (Bharat Maata Mandir Park), Indreshwar Mandir Park, Vishnu Lok Park, Technical Ground, and many others.

Krishna Nagar has many localities. The following are some of the prominent ones under Krishna Nagar Police Station supervision and Postal Division:

- Ashutosh Nagar
- Manas Nagar
- Vijay Nagar
- Hydel Colony
- Sindhu Nagar
- Gopal Nagar
- Vinay Nagar
- Ganesh Nagar
- Inderlok Colony
- Vishnu Lok
- Pandit Kera
- Jafar Khera
- Bhola Khera

== Transport ==
E-Rickshaws are available for public transport in the area. The residential area is served by Krishna Nagar Metro Station. The Lucknow International Airport is three kilometers from Krishna Nagar, the railway station is six, and the Alambagh Bus Station is four.

== Schools ==
Schools in the area include:

- Lucknow polytechnic
- Lucknow Model Public Inter College
- Adarsh Bharti Vidyalaya
- Bhupati Singh Memorial Inter College
- Awasiya Inter College
- Dream India School
- Mahanagar Public Inter College
- Cambridge school
- Bachpan, a play school
- Jaipuria school kanpur road campus
