= Gandhi Smriti =

Museum and death place of Mahatma Gandhi

Coordinates: 28.6019°N 77.2144°E

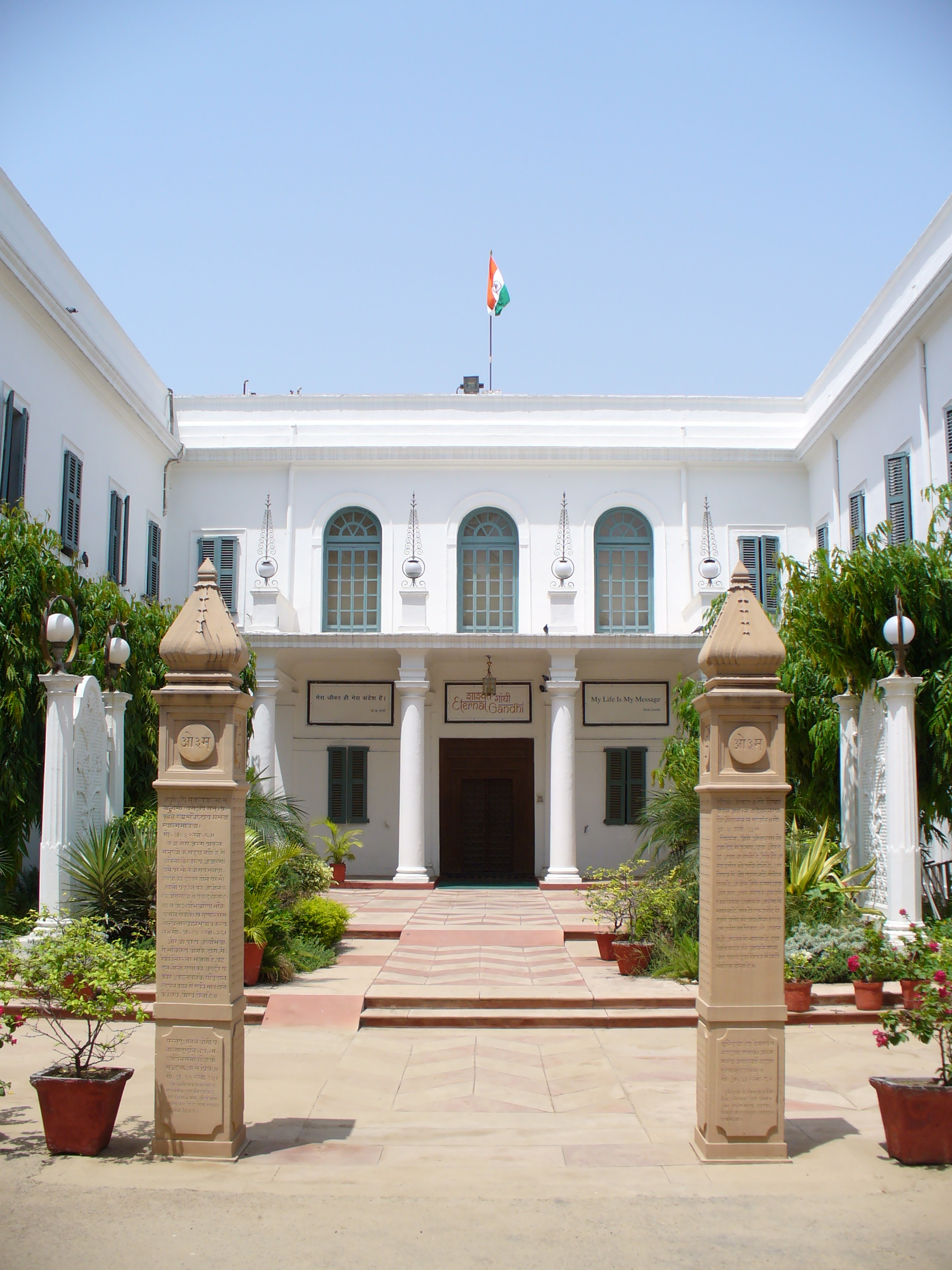
Gandhi Smriti (former Birla House), New Delhi, India

Gandhi Smriti, formerly known as Birla House or Birla Bhavan, is a museum dedicated to Mahatma Gandhi, situated on Tees January Road, formerly Albuquerque Road, in New Delhi, India. It is the location where Mahatma Gandhi spent the last 144 days of his life and was assassinated on 30 January 1948. It was originally the house of the Birla family, Indian business tycoons. It is now home to the Eternal Gandhi Multimedia Museum, which was established in 2005.

The museum is open every day except Mondays and national holidays. Entry is free for all.

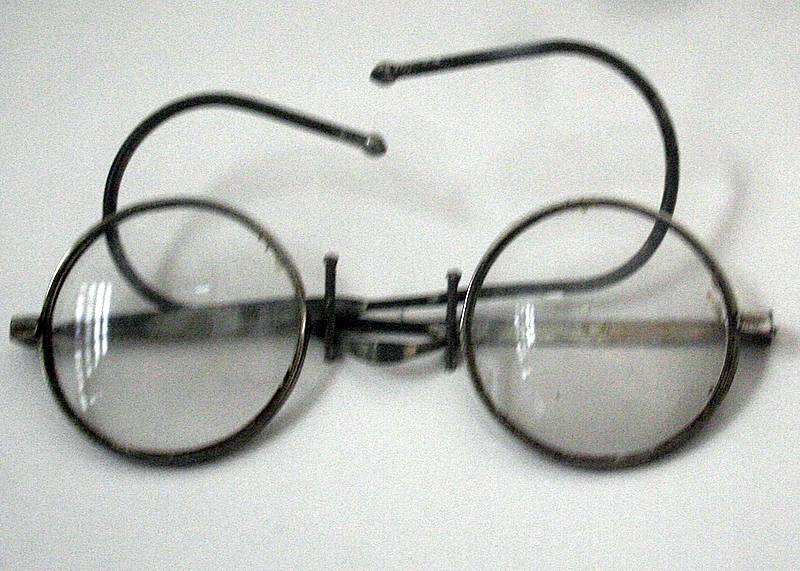
Gandhi's spectacles on display

== History ==
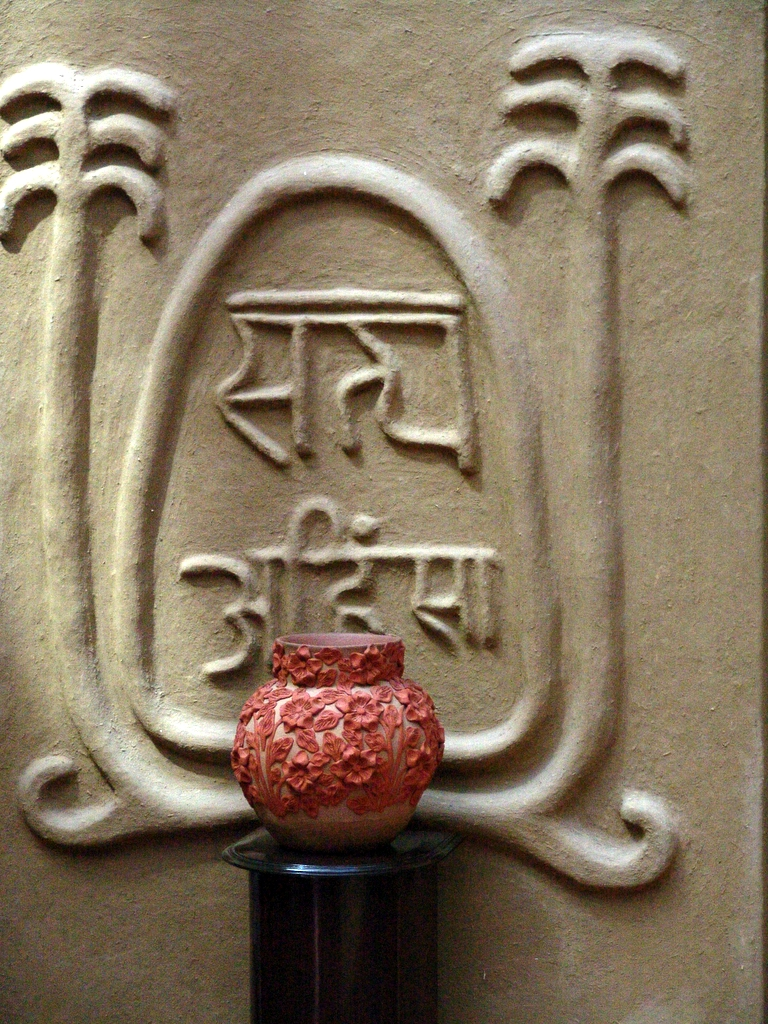
An exhibit at Eternal Gandhi Multimedia Museum, Gandhi Smriti

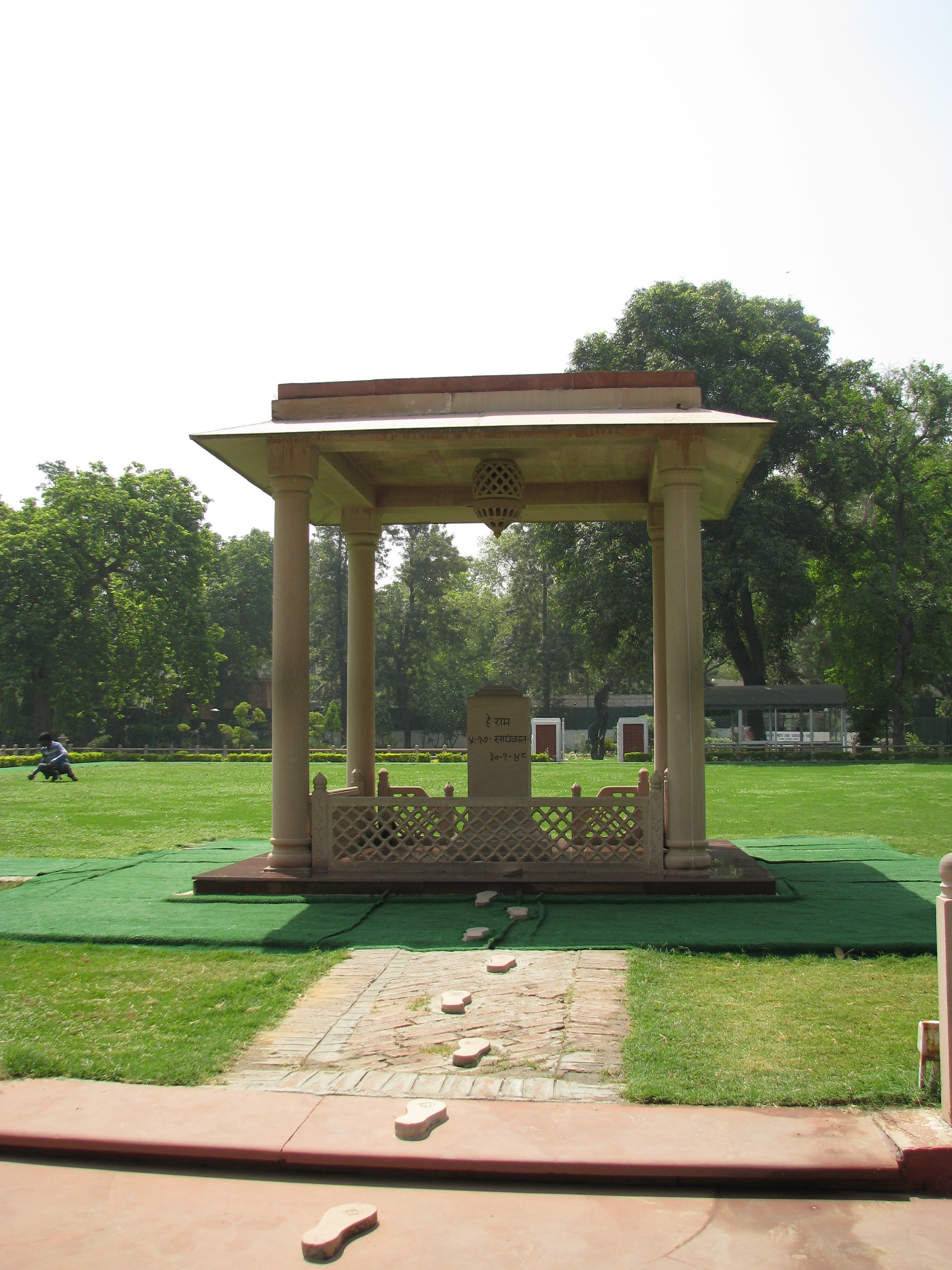
The 'Martyr's Column' at the Gandhi Smriti, the spot where Gandhi was assassinated.

The 12-bedroom house was built in 1928 by Ghanshyamdas Birla. Vallabhbhai Patel and Mahatma Gandhi were frequent guests of the Birlas. During his final stay, Gandhi stayed here from 9 September 1947 to 30 January 1948 when he was assassinated. Jawaharlal Nehru wrote to Ghanshyamdas Birla seeking to turn part of the Birla House into a memorial. Ghanshyamdas was rather reluctant to give up the house with associated memories. The Birla House was purchased from KK Birla, in 1971, by the Government of India, after protracted and tough negotiations, in which, according to some reports, he even included the cost of fruit trees in the sale price. Eventually KK Birla sold the property to the Government for Rs 54 lakhs and seven acres of urban land in exchange, which was considered a very profitable deal. Birla House opened for the public on 15 August 1973, renamed the Gandhi Smriti (or Gandhi Remembrance). The museum in the building houses a number of articles associated with Gandhi's life and death. Visitors can tour the building and grounds, viewing the preserved room where Gandhi lived and the place on the grounds where he was shot while holding his nightly public walk. Gandhi was shot during his prayers at the spot where Martyr's Column now stands.

The Gandhi Smriti or Birla House is located at 5 Tees January Marg, a couple of kilometres from the Connaught Place, one of the Central Business District's of New Delhi.

Outside the house stands a pillar that contains a swastika symbol. The prominence of the pillar means that it has been used as a visual example of the way the ethical meaning of the swastika symbol has changed in the West in the 20th century. The same pillar also contains the Sanskrit symbol for the meditation sound, Om.
