= Krishna Nagar metro station (Lucknow) =

Metro station in Uttar Pradesh, India

Krishna Nagar
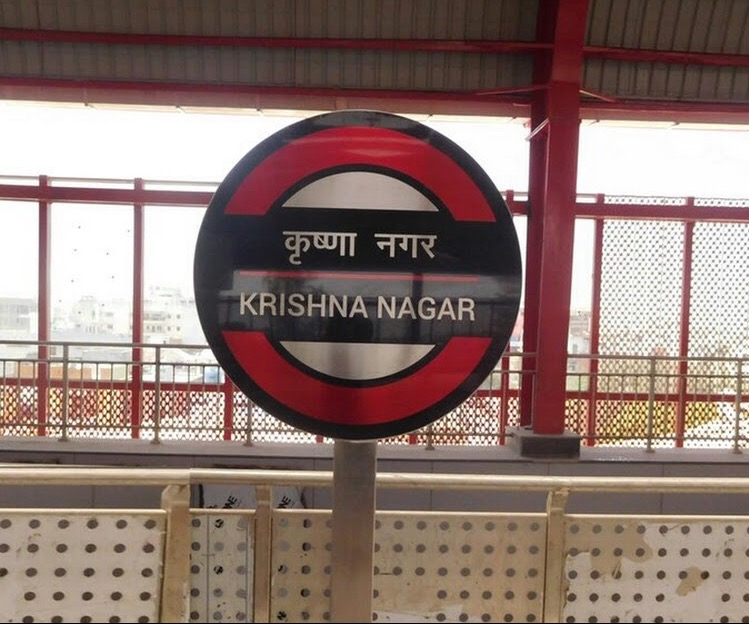

General information
- Location: Baldi Khera, Vijay Nagar Colony, Krishna Nagar, Alambagh, Lucknow, Uttar Pradesh 226023
- Coordinates: 26.794386°N 80.891721°E
- System: Lucknow Metro station
- Owner: Lucknow Metro
- Operator: Uttar Pradesh Metro Rail Corporation
- Line: Red Line
- Platforms: Side platform Platform-1 → Munshi Pulia; Platform-2 → CCS International Airport
- Tracks: 2

Construction
- Structure type: Elevated, Double track
- Platform levels: 2
- Parking: Two and Four Wheeler - Yes
- Accessible: Yes
- Architectural style: Lucknow Metro

Other information
- Status: Staffed

History
- Opened: 6 September 2017; 9 years ago
- Electrified: Single-phase 25 kV 50 Hz AC through overhead catenary

Services
| Preceding station | Lucknow Metro | Following station |
|---|---|---|
| Transport Nagar towards CCS International Airport | Red Line | Singar Nagar towards Munshi Pulia |
Route map
Location

Krishna Nagar is an important elevated metro station on the North-South Corridor of the Red Line of Lucknow Metro in the city of Lucknow, Uttar Pradesh, India, which is used for commuting hub for the residential areas of Krishna Nagar, LDA and Aashiyana.

Krishna Nagar is on the west side of Kanpur Highway and LDA and Aashiyana are on the east side of Kanpur road. It serves as a main mode of commute for the students studying in several educational institutions such as CMS-LDA branch and St.Thomas College-Sarojini Nagar. There is a parking space beside the station.

Krishna Nagar Metro Station was built in 2017.

== Station layout ==
| G | Street level | Exit/Entrance |
| L1 | Mezzanine | Fare control, station agent, Metro Card vending machines, crossover |
| L2 | Side platform | Doors will open on the left |
| L2 | Platform 2 Southbound | Towards → CCS International Airport; Next Station: Transport Nagar |
| L2 | Platform 1 Northbound | Towards ← Munshi Pulia; Next Station: Singar Nagar |
| L2 | Side platform | Doors will open on the left |
| L2 |

Krishna nagar metro station
- Interactive map of the Krishna nagar metro station area

General information
- Status: Completed
- Type: Railway station
- Location: Krishna Nagar, Lucknow, Lucknow, India
- Coordinates: 26°47′40″N 80°53′30″E
- Construction started: 2014
- Completed: 2017
- Opened: 6 September 2017
- Inaugurated: 5 September 2017

== Connections ==
The metro line connects Krishna Nagar to downtown, Alambagh, Alambagh Bus Station, Charbagh Railway Station, Hussain Ganj, Hazrat Ganj, IT College, Lucknow University, Indira Nagar, Badhshah Nagar, Mahanagar and Munshipuliya on the west and within a twenty-minute ride to the east, Transport Nagar, Amausi and CCS Airport.

== See also ==
- Lucknow
- List of Lucknow Metro stations
- Uttar Pradesh State Road Transport Corporation
- Rapid Transit in India
- List of metro systems
