= Gandhi Memorial Museum, Madurai =

Gandhi Memorial Museum
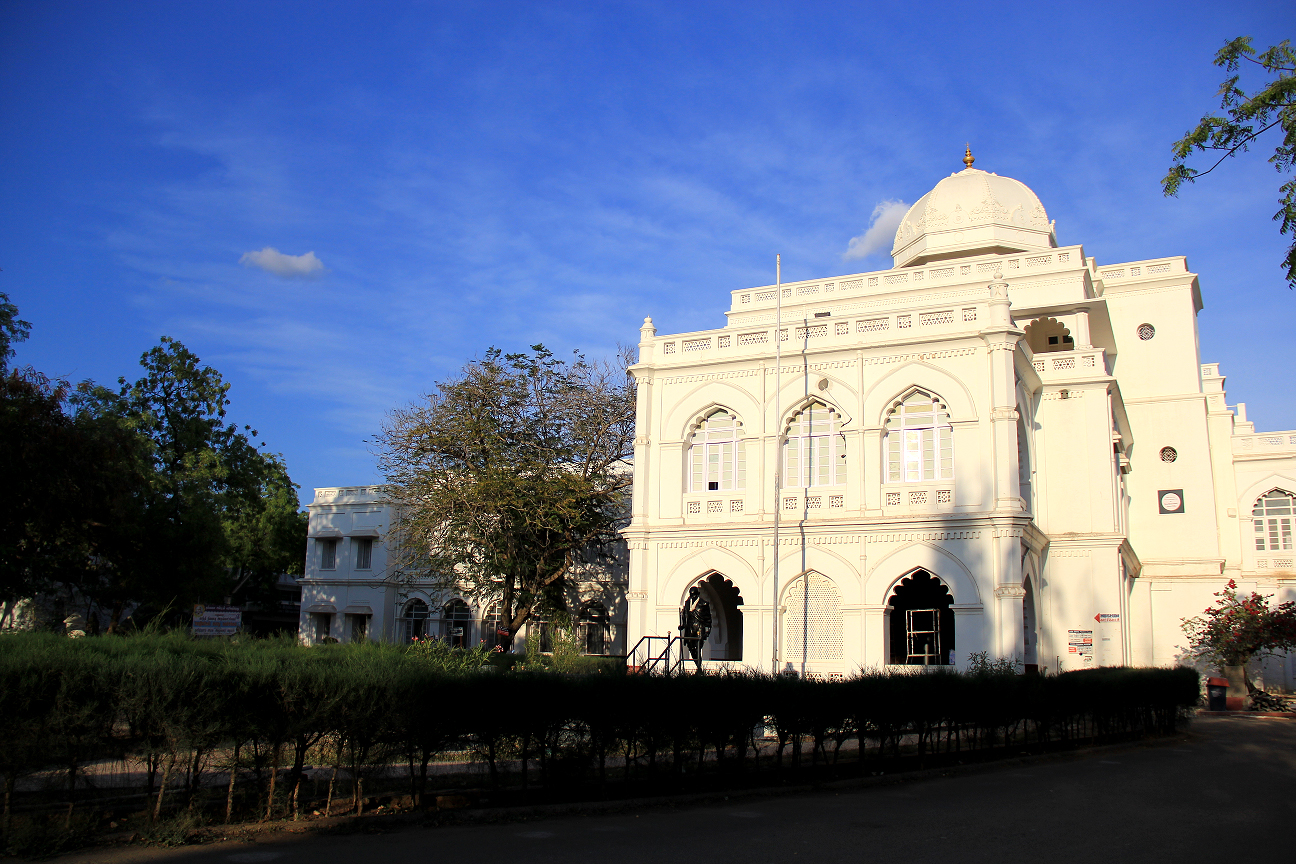
- Façade of the Gandhi Memorial Museum
- Established: 15 April 1959; 67 years ago as a memorial museum
- Location: Madurai, India
- Coordinates: 9.929923°N 78.138593°E
- Type: Memorial museum Biographical museum
- Visitors: about 6,50,000 (2023)
- Website: gandhimmm.org

Gandhi Memorial Museum, established in 1959, is a memorial museum for Mahatma Gandhi located in the city of Madurai in Tamil Nadu, India. Known as Gandhi Museum, it is now one of the five Gandhi Sanghralayas (Gandhi Museums) in the country. It includes a part of the blood-stained garment worn by Gandhi when he was assassinated by Nathuram Godse.

== History ==
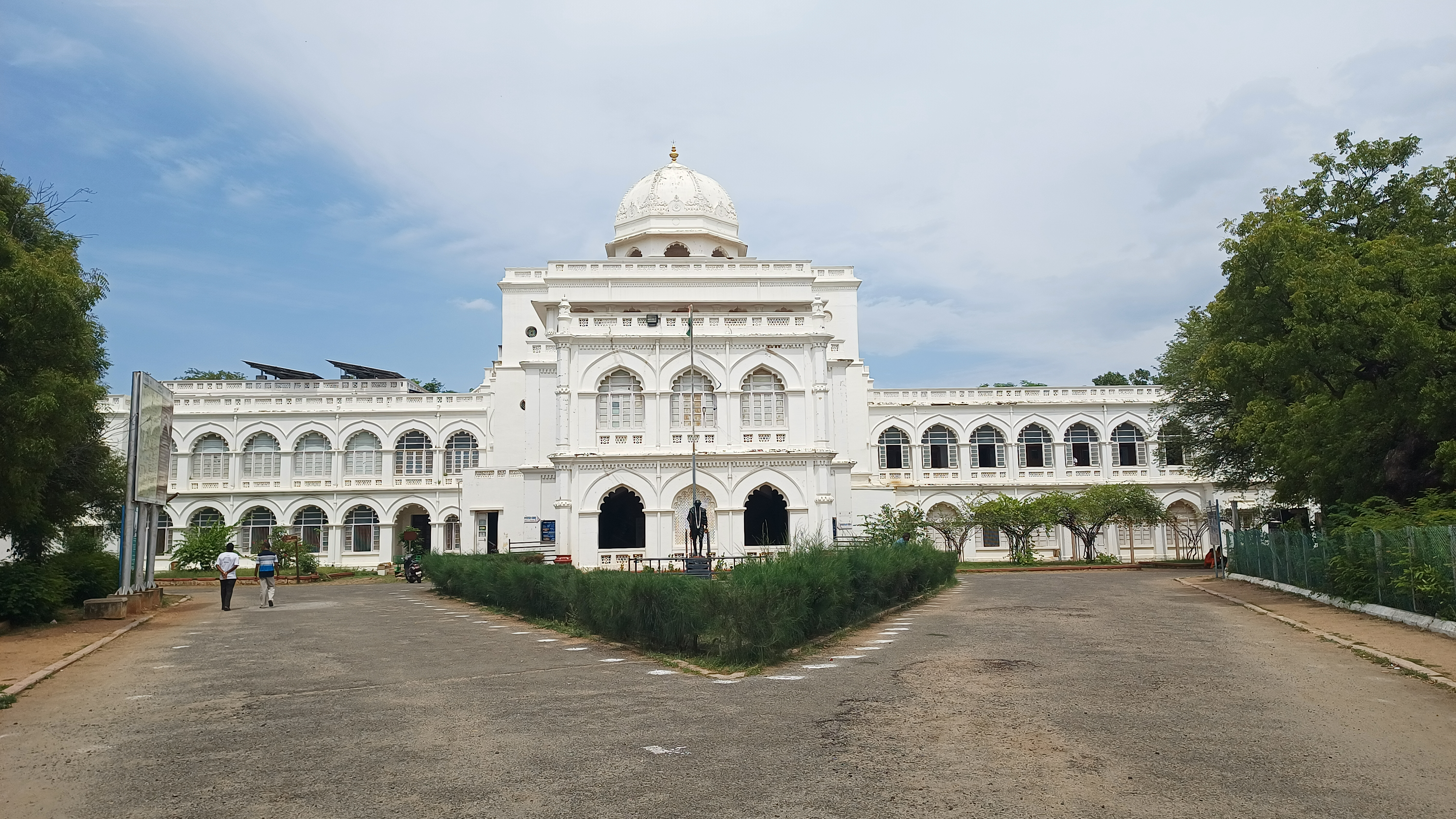
Gandhi Memorial Museum (exterior)

Years after the assassination of Mahatma Gandhi in 1948, an appeal was made to the citizens of India nationwide to build memorials for him. With the help of contributions from poor and rich citizens of India, a trust was established for this cause, the Mahatma Gandhi National Memorial Trust. This museum was inaugurated by the former Prime Minister Jawaharlal Nehru on 15 April 1959. Gandhi Memorial Museum in Madurai comes under the Peace Museums Worldwide selected by the United Nations Organisation (UNO). The palace of Rani Mangammal was renovated and converted into the museum. It is near the Madurai Collector Office.

== Collections in the Museum ==
The museum has an original letter written personally by Gandhiji to Narayanan Satsangi of Devakottai. A congratulatory message sent by Gandhiji to freedom fighter and poet Subramania Bharati is also preserved in this museum. Another interesting letter is the one written by the Mahatma Gandhi to Adolf Hitler addressing him as "Dear Friend".

=== India Fights for Freedom ===
A special exhibition on "India Fights for Freedom" with 265 illustrations depicts the history of the Freedom Movement.

=== Visual Biography of Gandhiji ===
Located in a quiet area, this memorial dedicated to Mahatma Gandhi features a visual biography composed of photographs, paintings, sculptures, manuscripts, quotations, and selected copies of his letters and writings. The collection includes 124 rare photographs documenting distinct phases of Gandhi's life, spanning from his childhood to his funeral procession.

=== Relics and Replicas ===
This section contains 14 original artifacts used by Gandhi. There is a blood-stained cloth used by Gandhi on the day of his assassination, although it is also said that this is only a replica and not the original. It is conserved inside a vacuum glass box, making viewers remember the importance of that day in the history of India.

== Gallery ==
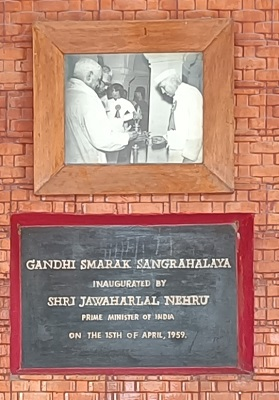

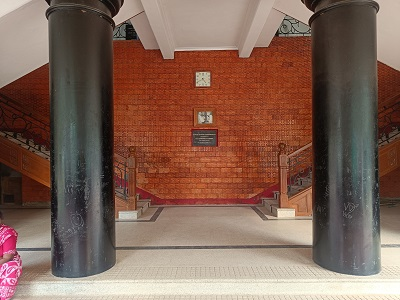

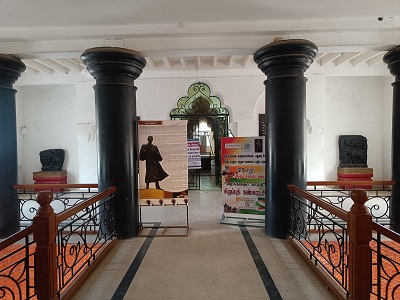

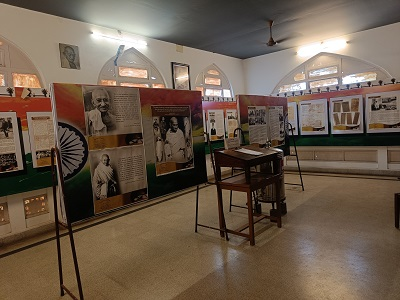

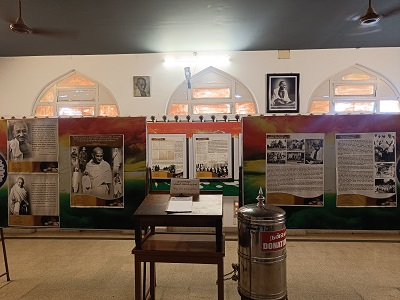

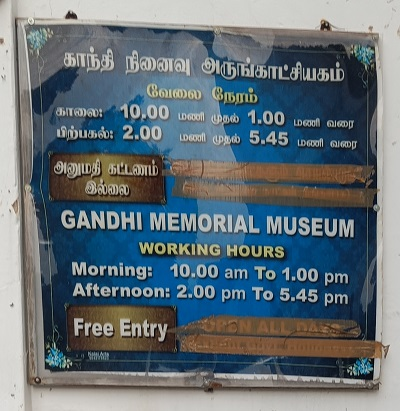
