= Legacy of Mahatma Gandhi =

Mahatma Gandhi (2 October 1869 – 30 January 1948) is a major figure in the history of India and has left a substantial legacy in the country's culture.

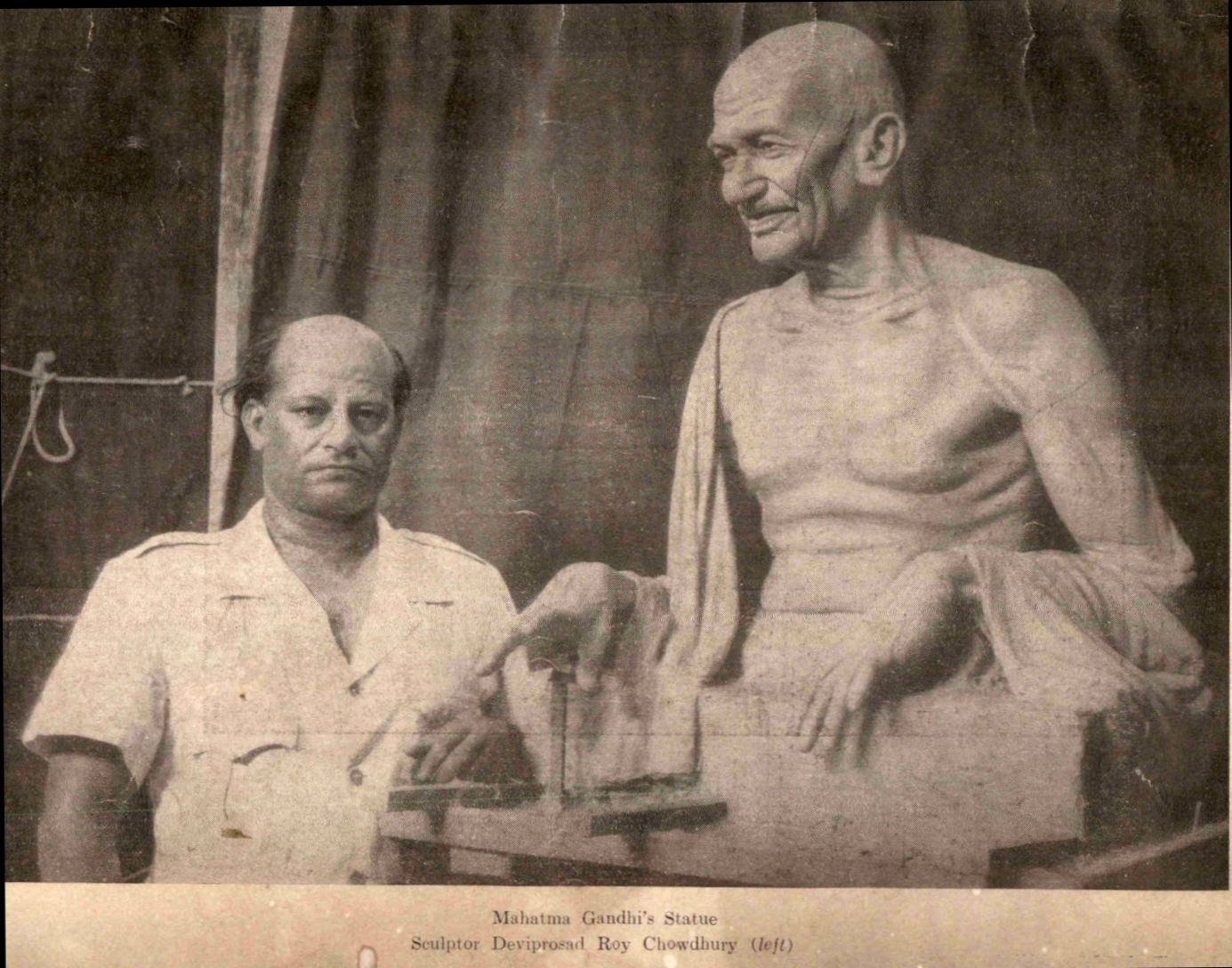
Indian sculptor Devi Prasad Roy Choudhury with his sculpture of Gandhi

He is noted as the greatest figure of the successful Indian independence movement against the British rule. He is also hailed as the greatest figure of modern India. American historian Stanley Wolpert described Gandhi as "India's greatest revolutionary nationalist leader" and the greatest Indian since the Buddha. In 1999, Gandhi was named "Asian of the century" by Asiaweek. In a 2000 BBC poll, he was voted as the greatest man of the millennium.

== Overview ==
The word Mahatma, while often mistaken for Gandhi's given name in the West, is taken from the Sanskrit words maha (meaning Great) and atma (meaning Soul). He was publicly bestowed with the honorific title "Mahatma" in July 1914 at farewell meeting in Town Hall, Durban. Rabindranath Tagore is said to have accorded the title to Gandhi by 1915. (Note: The earliest record of usage, however, is in a private letter from Pranjivan Mehta to Gopal Krishna Gokhale dated 1909.) In his autobiography, Gandhi nevertheless explains that he never valued the title, and was often pained by it.

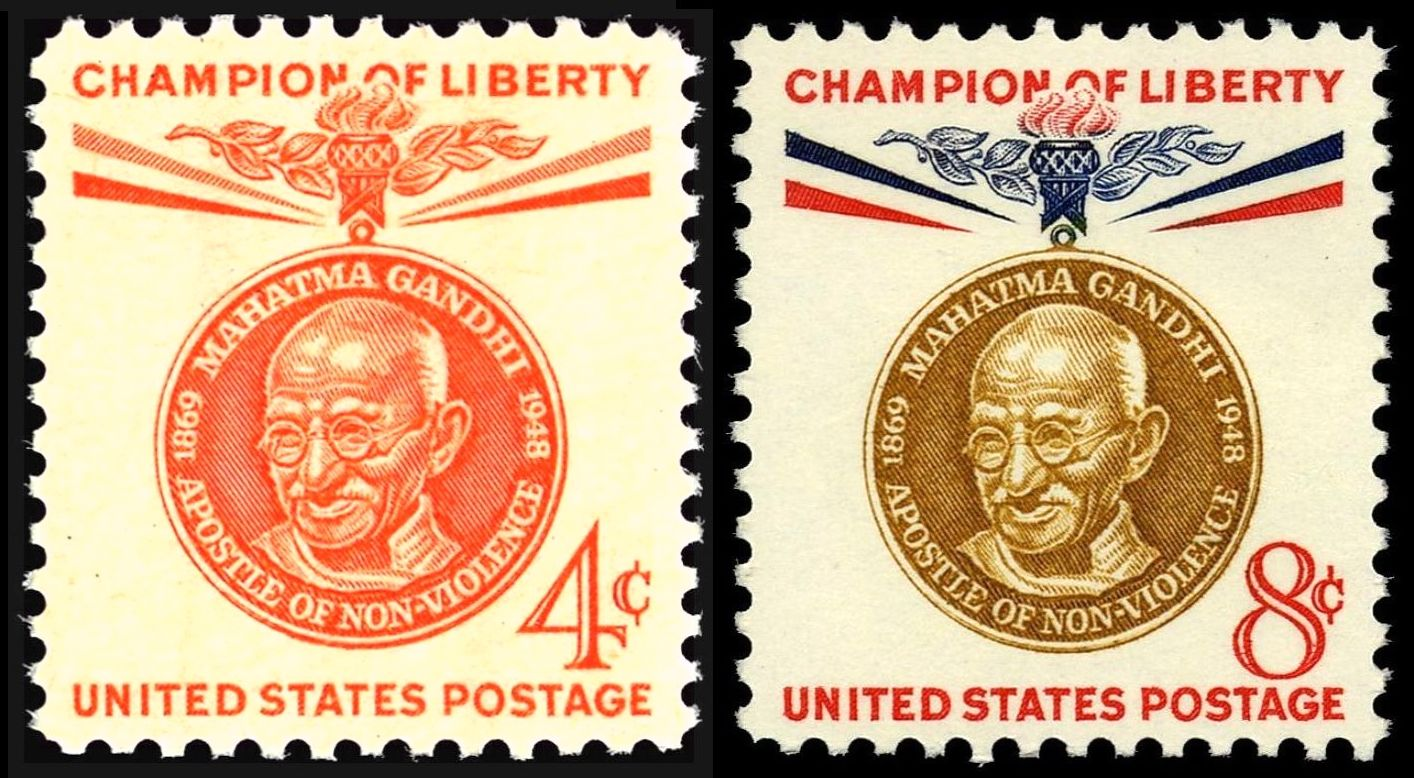
In 1961 the U.S. government issued two commemorative stamps in honour of Mahatma Gandhi.

Innumerable streets, roads, and localities in India are named after Gandhi. These include M.G. Road (the main street of a number of Indian cities including Mumbai, Bangalore, Kolkata, Lucknow, Kanpur, Gangtok and Indore), Gandhi Market (near Sion, Mumbai) and Gandhinagar (the capital of the state of Gujarat, Gandhi's birthplace).

As of 2008, over 150 countries have released stamps on Gandhi. In October 2019, about 87 countries including Turkey, the United States, Russia, Iran, Uzbekistan, and Palestine released commemorative Gandhi stamps on the 150th anniversary of his birth.

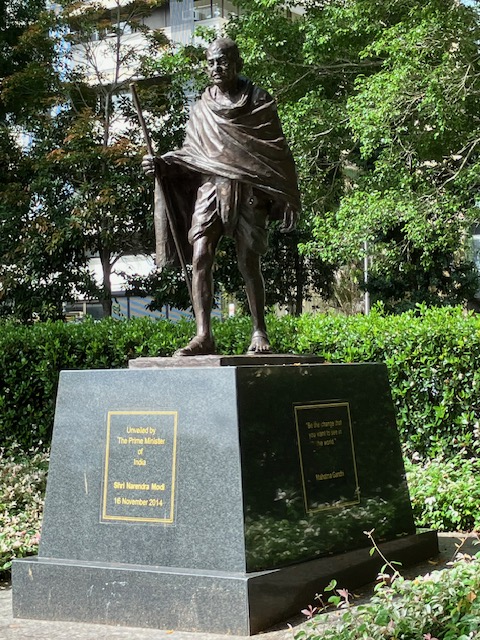
Statue of Gandhi, in the Roma Street Parkland, Brisbane, Australia

In 2014, Brisbane's Indian community commissioned a statue of Gandhi, created by Ram V. Sutar and Anil Sutar in the Roma Street Parkland, It was unveiled by Narendra Modi, then Prime Minister of India.

Florian asteroid 120461 Gandhi was named in his honour in September 2020. In October 2022, a statue of Gandhi was installed in Astana on the embankment of the rowing canal, opposite the cult monument to the defenders of Kazakhstan.

On 15 December 2022, the United Nations headquarters in New York unveiled the statue of Gandhi. UN Secretary-General António Guterres called Gandhi an "uncompromising advocate for peaceful co-existence."

On 11 April 2025, the Anglo-Boer War Museum in Bloemfontein, South Africa launched a documentary called Caught in the Crossfire: Indian Involvement in the South African War, and unveiled a bust of Gandhi. This was part of the museum's initiatives to acknowledge the role of Indian individuals — soldiers, stretcher-bearers and civilians — who were caught in the conflict between the British and the Boers during the Second Boer War.

== Followers and international influence ==
Gandhi influenced important leaders and political movements. Leaders of the civil rights movement in the United States, including Martin Luther King Jr., James Lawson, and James Bevel, drew from the writings of Gandhi in the development of their own theories about nonviolence. King said, "Christ gave us the goals and Mahatma Gandhi the tactics." King sometimes referred to Gandhi as "the little brown saint." Anti-apartheid activist and former President of South Africa, Nelson Mandela, was inspired by Gandhi. Others include Steve Biko, Václav Havel, and Aung San Suu Kyi.

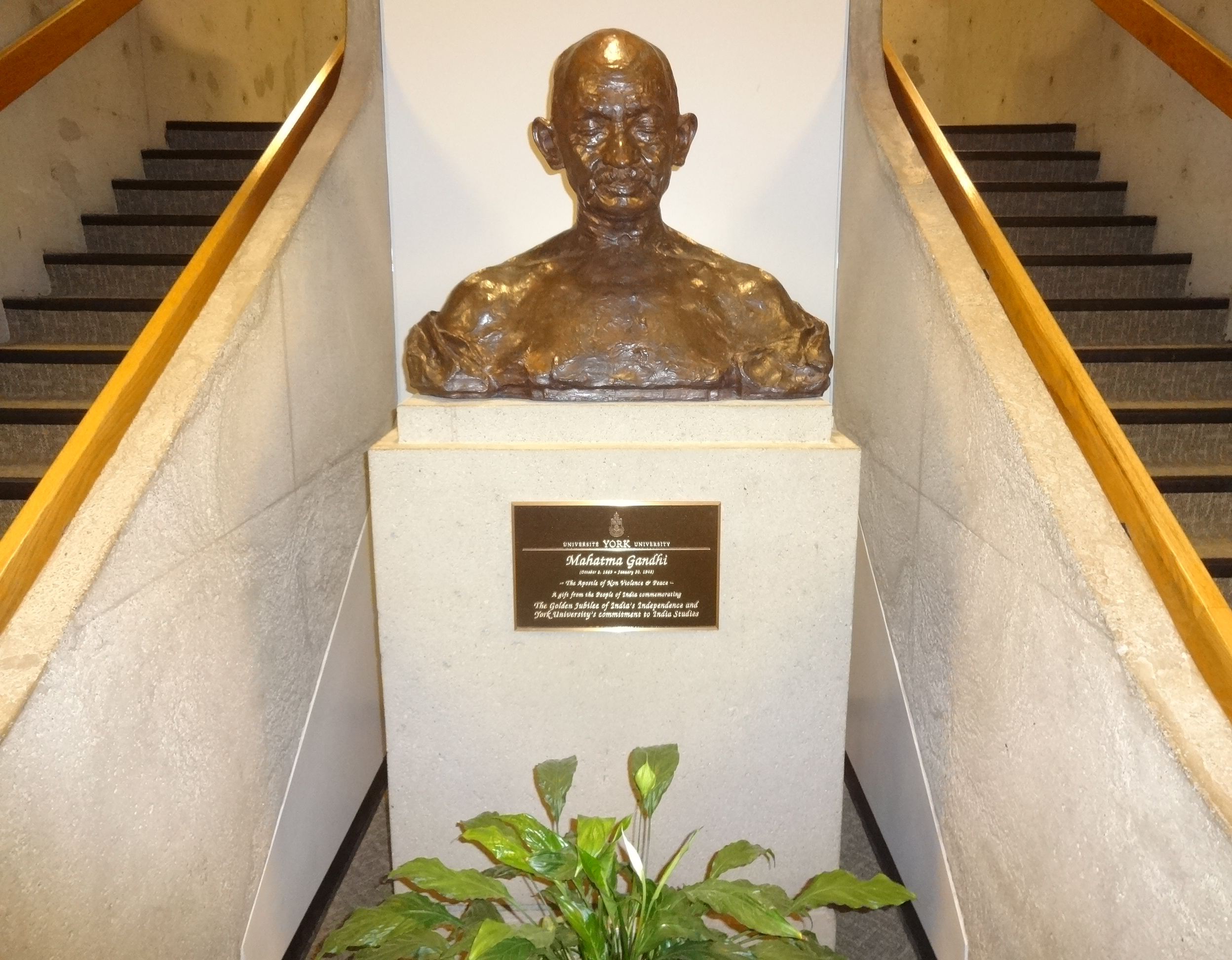
Bust of Gandhi at York University, Toronto, Canada

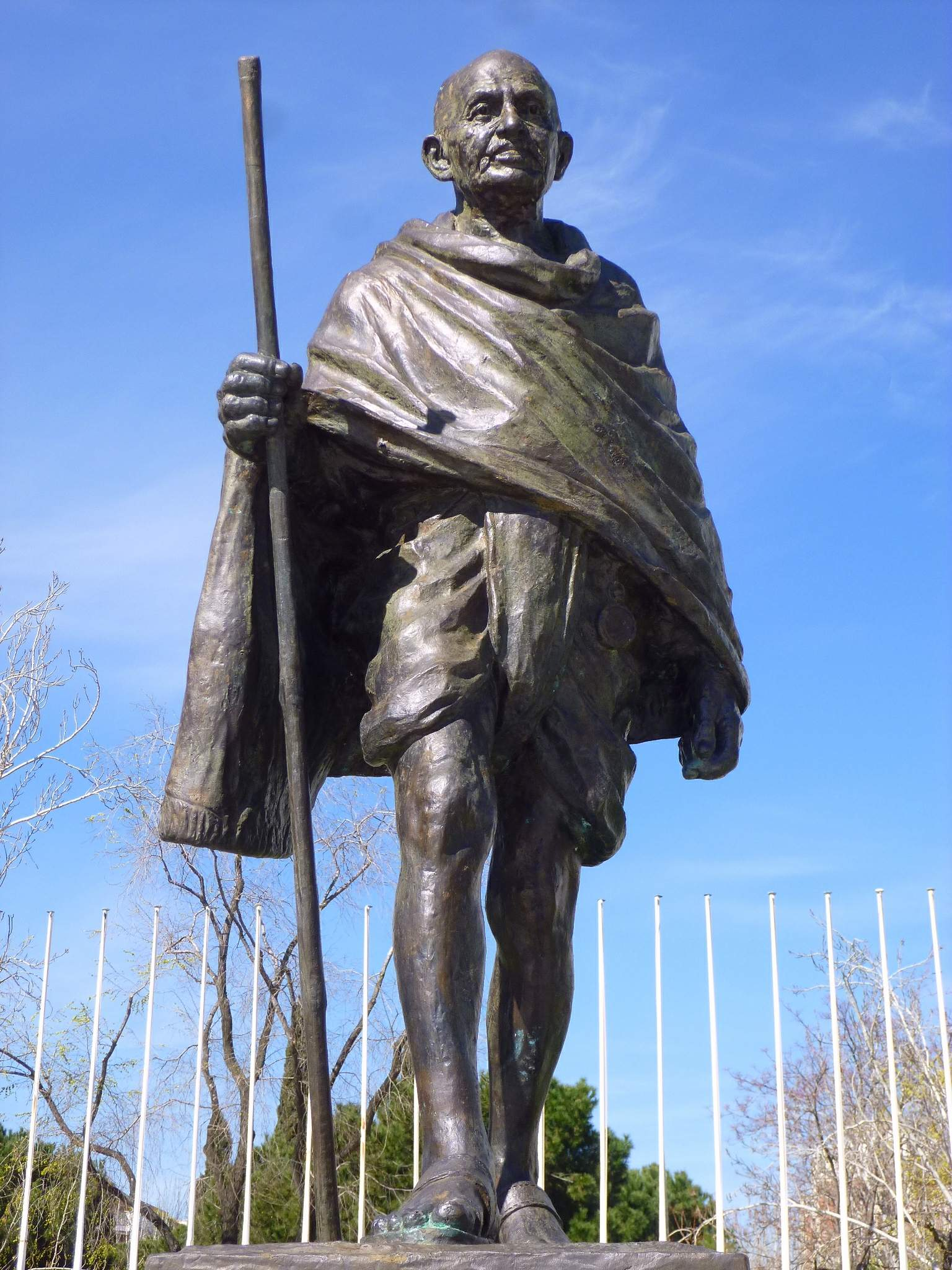
Statue of Gandhi in Madrid, Spain

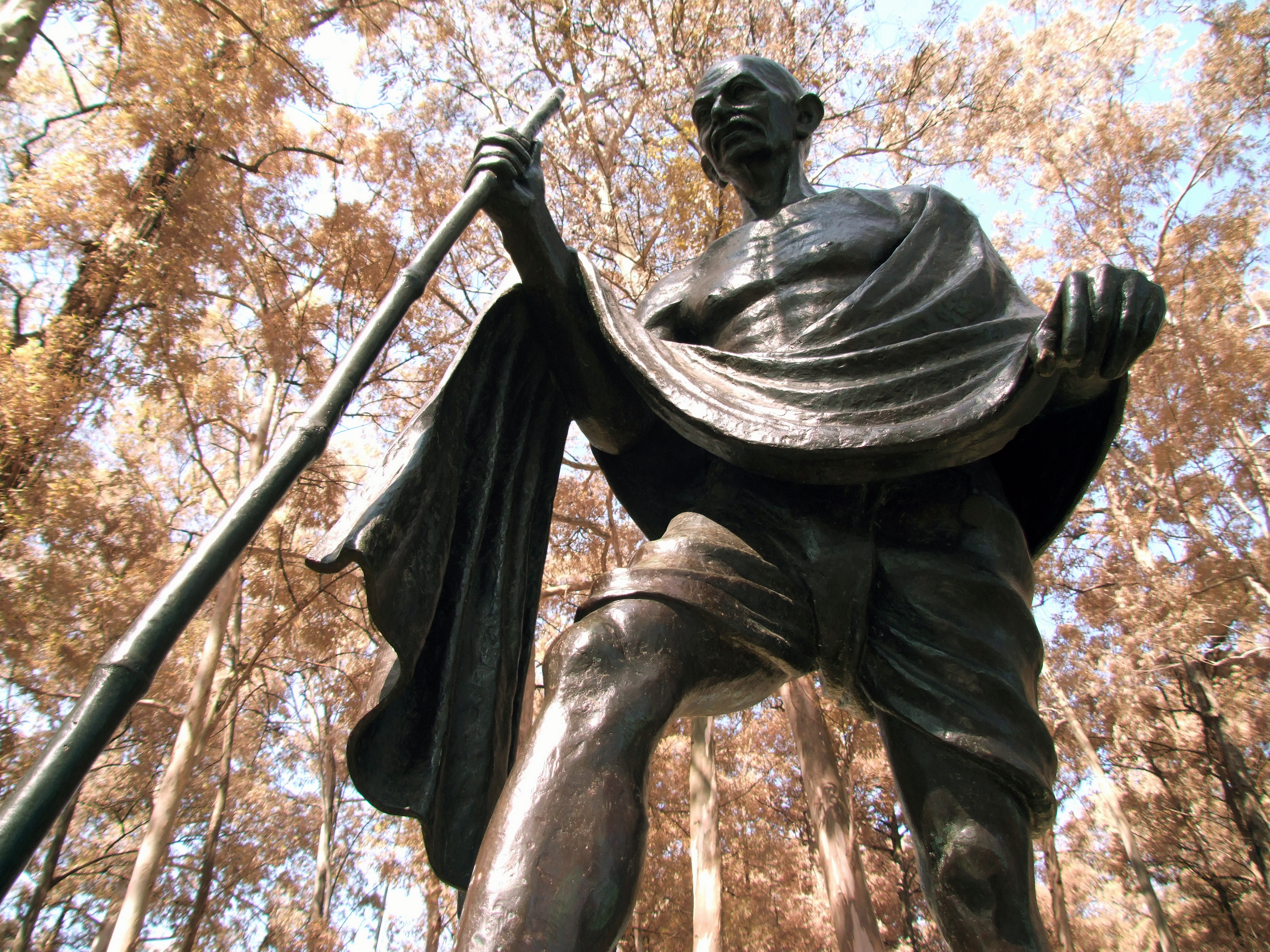
Gandhi at Praça Túlio Fontoura, São Paulo, Brazil

In his early years, the former President of South Africa Nelson Mandela was a follower of the nonviolent resistance philosophy of Gandhi. Bhana and Vahed commented on these events as "Gandhi inspired succeeding generations of South African activists seeking to end White rule. This legacy connects him to Nelson Mandela...in a sense, Mandela completed what Gandhi started."

Gandhi's life and teachings inspired many who specifically referred to Gandhi as their mentor or who dedicated their lives to spreading his ideas. In Europe, Romain Rolland was the first to discuss Gandhi in his 1924 book Mahatma Gandhi, and Brazilian anarchist and feminist Maria Lacerda de Moura wrote about Gandhi in her work on pacifism. In 1931, physicist Albert Einstein exchanged letters with Gandhi and called him "a role model for the generations to come" in a letter writing about him. Einstein said of Gandhi:

Mahatma Gandhi's life achievement stands unique in political history. He has invented a completely new and humane means for the liberation war of an oppressed country, and practised it with greatest energy and devotion. The moral influence he had on the consciously thinking human being of the entire civilised world will probably be much more lasting than it seems in our time with its overestimation of brutal violent forces. Because lasting will only be the work of such statesmen who wake up and strengthen the moral power of their people through their example and educational works. We may all be happy and grateful that destiny gifted us with such an enlightened contemporary, a role model for the generations to come. Generations to come will scarce believe that such a one as this walked the earth in flesh and blood.

Farah Omar, a political activist from Somaliland, visited India in 1930, where he met Gandhi and was influenced by Gandhi's non-violent philosophy, which he adopted in his campaign in British Somaliland.

Lanza del Vasto went to India in 1936 intending to live with Gandhi; he later returned to Europe to spread Gandhi's philosophy and founded the Community of the Ark in 1948 (modelled after Gandhi's ashrams). Madeleine Slade (known as "Mirabehn") was the daughter of a British admiral who spent much of her adult life in India as a devotee of Gandhi.

In addition, the British musician John Lennon referred to Gandhi when discussing his views on nonviolence. In 2007, former US Vice-President and environmentalist Al Gore drew upon Gandhi's idea of satyagraha in a speech on climate change. 44th President of the United States Barack Obama said in September 2009 that his biggest inspiration came from Gandhi. His reply was in response to the question: "Who was the one person, dead or live, that you would choose to dine with?" Obama added, "He's somebody I find a lot of inspiration in. He inspired Dr. King with his message of nonviolence. He ended up doing so much and changed the world just by the power of his ethics."

Time magazine named The 14th Dalai Lama, Lech Wałęsa, Martin Luther King Jr., Cesar Chavez, Aung San Suu Kyi, Benigno Aquino Jr., Desmond Tutu, and Nelson Mandela as Children of Gandhi and his spiritual heirs to nonviolence. The Mahatma Gandhi District in Houston, Texas, United States, an ethnic Indian enclave, is officially named after Gandhi.

Gandhi's ideas had a significant influence on 20th-century philosophy. It began with his engagement with Romain Rolland and Martin Buber. Jean-Luc Nancy said that the French philosopher Maurice Blanchot engaged critically with Gandhi from the point of view of "European spirituality." Since then philosophers including Hannah Arendt, Etienne Balibar and Slavoj Žižek found that Gandhi was a necessary reference to discuss morality in politics. American political scientist Gene Sharp wrote an analytical text, Gandhi as a political strategist, on the significance of Gandhi's ideas, for creating nonviolent social change. Recently, in the light of climate change, Gandhi's views on technology are gaining importance in the fields of environmental philosophy and philosophy of technology.

== Global days that celebrate Gandhi ==
In 2007, the United Nations General Assembly declared Gandhi's birthday, 2 October, as "the International Day of Nonviolence". First proposed by UNESCO in 1948, as the School Day of Nonviolence and Peace (DENIP in Spanish), 30 January is observed as the School Day of Nonviolence and Peace in schools of many countries. In countries with a Southern Hemisphere school calendar, it is observed on 30 March.

== Awards ==
Time magazine named Gandhi the Man of the Year in 1930. In the same magazine's 1999 list of The Most Important People of the Century, Gandhi was second only to Albert Einstein, who had called Gandhi "the greatest man of our age." The University of Nagpur awarded him an LL.D. in 1937. The Government of India awarded the annual Gandhi Peace Prize to distinguished social workers, world leaders and citizens. Nelson Mandela, the leader of South Africa's struggle to eradicate racial discrimination and segregation, was a prominent non-Indian recipient. In 2003, Gandhi was posthumously awarded with the World Peace Prize. Two years later, he was posthumously awarded with the Order of the Companions of O. R. Tambo. In 2011, Gandhi topped the Time's list of Top 25 Political Icons of All Time.

Gandhi did not receive the Nobel Peace Prize, although he was nominated five times between 1937 and 1948, including the first-ever nomination by the American Friends Service Committee, though Gandhi made the short list only twice, in 1937 and 1947. Decades later, the Nobel Committee publicly declared its regret for the omission and admitted to deeply divided nationalistic opinion denying the award. Gandhi was nominated in 1948 but was assassinated before nominations closed. That year, the committee chose not to award the peace prize stating that "there was no suitable living candidate", and later research shows that the possibility of awarding the prize posthumously to Gandhi was discussed and that the reference to no suitable living candidate was to Gandhi. Geir Lundestad, Secretary of Norwegian Nobel Committee in 2006 said, "The greatest omission in our 106-year history is undoubtedly that Mahatma Gandhi never received the Nobel Peace Prize. Gandhi could do without the Nobel Peace Prize, whether Nobel committee can do without Gandhi is the question." When the 14th Dalai Lama was awarded the Prize in 1989, the chairman of the committee said that this was "in part a tribute to the memory of Mahatma Gandhi." In the summer of 1995, the North American Vegetarian Society inducted Gandhi posthumously into the Vegetarian Hall of Fame.

=== Father of the Nation ===
Indians widely describe Gandhi as the Father of the Nation. Origin of this title is traced back to a radio address (on Singapore radio) on 6 July 1944 by Subhash Chandra Bose where Bose addressed Gandhi as "The Father of the Nation". On 28 April 1947, Sarojini Naidu during a conference also referred Gandhi as "Father of the Nation". He is also conferred the title "Bapu" (Gujarati: endearment for father, papa).

== Artistic depictions ==
Gandhi’s image, biography, and imagined stories about his life appear in stamps, currency, film, literature, plays, video games, and works of visual art.

== 21st-century impact within India ==
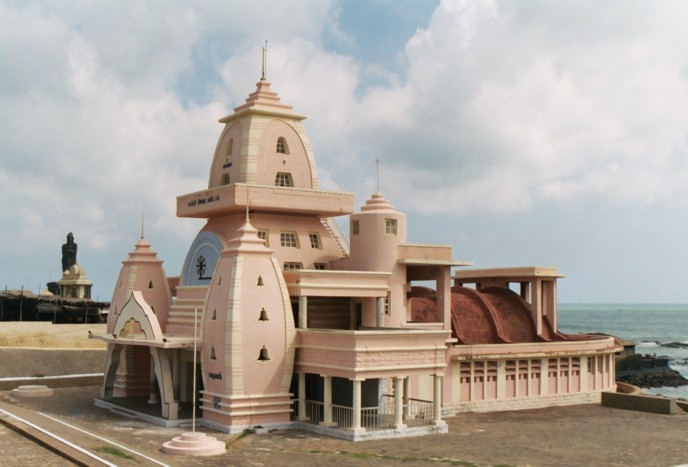
The Gandhi Mandapam, a temple in Kanyakumari, was erected in honour of Gandhi.

India, with its rapid economic modernisation and urbanisation, has rejected Gandhi's economics but accepted much of his politics and continues to revere his memory. Reporter Jim Yardley notes that "modern India is hardly a Gandhian nation, if it ever was one. His vision of a village-dominated economy was shunted aside during his lifetime as rural romanticism, and his call for a national ethos of personal austerity and nonviolence has proved antithetical to the goals of an aspiring economic and military power." By contrast, Gandhi is "given full credit for India's political identity as a tolerant, secular democracy."

Gandhi's birthday, 2 October, is a national holiday in India, Gandhi Jayanti. His image also appears on paper currency of all denominations issued by Reserve Bank of India, except for the one rupee note. Gandhi's date of death, 30 January, is commemorated as a Martyrs' Day in India.

There are three temples in India dedicated to Gandhi. One is located at Sambalpur in Odisha, the second at Nidaghatta village near Kadur in Chikmagalur district of Karnataka, and the third at Chityal in the district of Nalgonda, Telangana. In Tamil Nadu, the Gandhi Memorial in Kanyakumari resembles central Indian Hindu temples and the Tamukkam or Summer Palace in Madurai now houses the Mahatma Gandhi Museum.

== Descendants ==
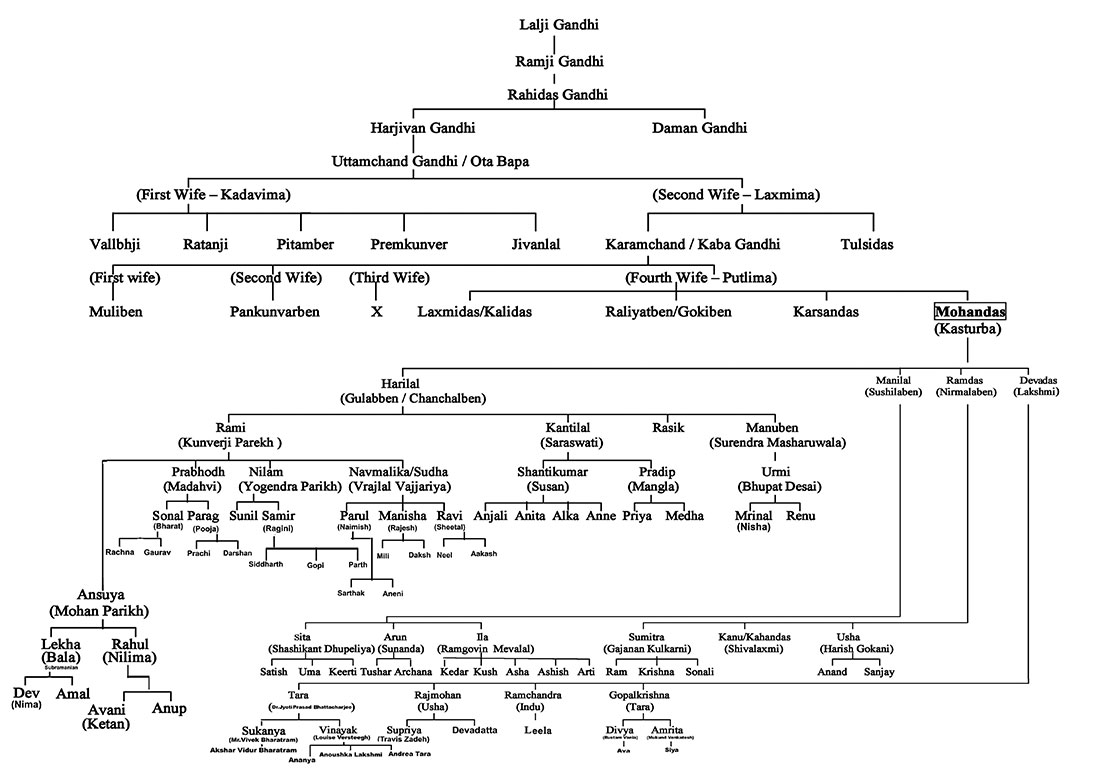
Family tree of Mohandas Karamchand Gandhi and Kasturba Gandhi

Gandhi's children and grandchildren live in India and other countries. Grandson Rajmohan Gandhi is a professor in Illinois and an author of Gandhi's biography titled Mohandas, while another, Tarun Gandhi, has authored several authoritative books on his grandfather. Another grandson, Kanu Ramdas Gandhi (the son of Gandhi's third son Ramdas), was found living at an old age home in Delhi despite having taught earlier in the United States.

== See also ==
- List of things named after Mahatma Gandhi
- Gandhism
