= List of roads named after Mahatma Gandhi =

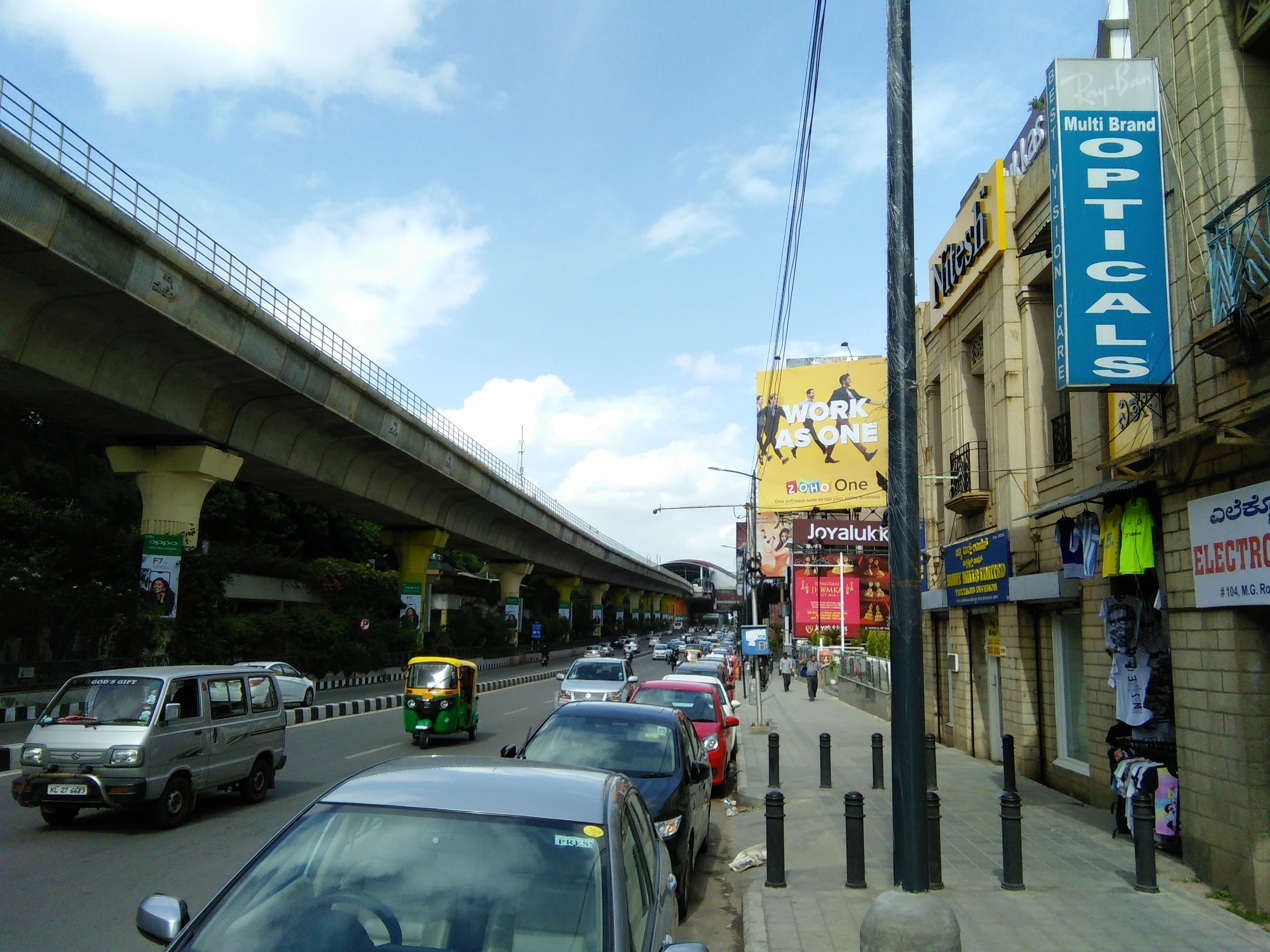
Mahatma Gandhi Road in Bangalore, India

Several roads across the world are named after the Indian anti-colonial nationalist and lawyer, Mohandas Karamchand Gandhi (a.k.a. Mahatma Gandhi), known for his nonviolent resistance to lead a successful campaign for India's independence from British Rule.

In some places, the roads are also known by their abbreviated form "M.G. Road". In other countries, Mahatma Gandhi Road is known by different names, including Gandhistraat, Gandhiweg, and Gandhiplein .

M.G. Road is one of the most frequently used road names in India, Agra having two of them. Several other Indian cities have a road by this name. In 2010, attempts were made to rename Hillcroft Avenue in Houston, Texas to Mahatma Gandhi Avenue but the proponents were unable to secure signatures from 75% of the property owners. As a result, the group settled for renaming the areas around Hillcroft Avenue to Mahatma Gandhi district. In Kolkata, Central Road has renamed Harrison Road in 1892 after Sir Henry Leland Harrison, then the chairman of Calcutta Corporation; it has recently been renamed again to Mahatma Gandhi Road. In many cities in South India, Mahatma Gandhi Road is popularly known by other names. In Chennai, it is known as Nungambakkam High Road. In Coimbatore, Mahatma Gandhi Road is popularly known by Avarampalayam Road.

== In India ==
State/UT	City	Name
Andhra Pradesh	Guntur	Mahatma Gandhi Inner Ring Road
Andhra Pradesh	Ongole	Gandhi Road
Andhra Pradesh	Tirupathi	Gandhi Road
Andhra Pradesh	Vijayawada	Mahatma Gandhi Road
Assam	Dispur	Mahatma Gandhi Path
Assam	Uzan Bazaar, Guwahati	Mahatma Gandhi Road
Bihar	Patna	Gandhi Maidan Marg
Bihar	Mahatma Gandhi Nagar	
Chhattisgarh	Raigarh	Mahatma Gandhi Road
Chhattisgarh	Raipur	Mahatma Gandhi Road
Dadra and Nagar Haveli and Daman and Diu	Daman	Mahatma Gandhi Marg
Delhi	Adarsh Nagar	Mahatma Gandhi Marg
Delhi	Civil Lines, Delhi	Mahatma Gandhi Marg
Delhi	Lajpat Nagar	Mahatma Gandhi Marg
Delhi	Mukherjee Nagar	Mahatma Gandhi Marg
Delhi	Ramesh Nagar	Mahatma Gandhi Marg
Delhi	Timarpur	Mahatma Gandhi Marg
Goa	Panaji	MG Road
Gujarat	Ahmedabad-Vadodara	Mahatma Gandhi Expressway (National Expressway 1)
Gujarat	Bardoli	MG Road, Bardoli
Gujarat	Porbandar	MG Road, Sudama Chowk
Gujarat	Surat	MG Road, Chowk Bazaar to Station
Gujarat	Vadodara	MG Road, Karkadiya
Gujarat	Vadodara	MG Road, Yakputpur
Gujarat	Veraval	MG Road, Veraval
Karnataka	Bangalore	Mahatma Gandhi Road
Karnataka	Mangalore	Mahatma Gandhi Road
Karnataka	Mysore	Gandhi Square
Karnataka	Mysore	Mahatma Gandhi Road
Karnataka	Tumkur	Mahatma Gandhi Road
Karnataka	Bellary	Mahatma Gandhi Road
Karnataka	Kolar	Mahatma Gandhi Road
Karnataka	Hassan	Mahatma Gandhi Road
Kerala	Kochi	Mahatma Gandhi Road
Kerala	Kottayam	MG Road
Kerala	Thiruvananthapuram	MG Road
Kerala	Thrissur	Mahatma Gandhi Road
Madhya Pradesh	Gwalior	Gandhi Road
Madhya Pradesh	Indore	Mahatma Gandhi Marg
Maharashtra	Ahmednagar	Mahatma Gandhi road
Maharashtra	Akola	Gandhi road
Maharashtra	Mumbai	MG Road, Fort
Maharashtra	Mumbai	MG Road, Kandivali-West
Maharashtra	Mumbai	MG Road, Pant Nagar, Ghatkopar East
Maharashtra	Mumbai	MG Road, Borivali East
Maharashtra	Mumbai	MG Road 2, Kandivali
Maharashtra	Mumbai	MG Road 2, Goregaon
Maharashtra	Nashik	MG Road
Maharashtra	Pune	MG Road
Maharashtra	Thane	Mahatma Gandhi Road
Maharashtra	Wardha	MG Road
Meghalaya	Shillong	MG Road
Manipur	Imphal	MG Avenue
Puducherry	Pondicherry	Mahatma Gandhi Road
Sikkim	Gangtok	Mahatma Gandhi Marg
Tamil Nadu	Chennai	Mahatma Gandhi Road, more popularly known as Nungambakkam High Road. Hosur in Tamilnadu
Tamil Nadu	Coimbatore	Mahatma Gandhi Road, more popularly known as Sarojini Naidu Road.
Telangana	Secunderabad	Mahatma Gandhi Road
Uttar Pradesh	Agra	Mahatma Gandhi Road and Mahatma Gandhi Road II
Uttar Pradesh	Allahabad	Mahatma Gandhi Marg
Uttar Pradesh	Bahraich	Mahatma Gandhi Road, Bahraich
Uttar Pradesh	Kanpur	Mahatma Gandhi Road, Kanpur
Uttar Pradesh	Lucknow	Mahatma Gandhi Road, Lucknow
West Bengal	Kolkata	Mahatma Gandhi Road (Kolkata)Mahatma Gandhi Road, Haridevpur
West Bengal	Durgapur	Mahatma Gandhi Road, Durgapur

== Outside India ==
Country	City	State/Province	Name				
Argentina	Buenos Aires	-	Mahatma Gandhi				
Bangladesh	Jashore	-	Mahatma Gandhi Road . Popularly known as MG Road.				
Belgium	Mechelen	Antwerp Province	Mahatma Gandhiwijk				
Belgium	Ghent	East Flanders	Mahatma Gandhistraat				
Belgium	Molenbeek-Saint-Jean	Brussels	Avenue Mahatma Gandhi/Mahatma Gandhilaan				
Brazil	Rio de Janeiro	Rio de Janeiro (state)	Praça Mahatma Gandhi				
Canada	Winnipeg	Manitoba	Mahatma Gandhi Way				
Croatia	Zagreb	-	Ulica Mahatme Gandhija				
France	Courdimanche	Île-de-France	Avenue Gandhi				
France	Paris	Île-de-France	Avenue du Mahatma Gandhi				
Germany	Hanover	Lower Saxony	Gandhi straße,				
Germany	Bremen	Bremen (state)	Gandhi Straße				
Germany	Darmstadt	Hesse	Mahatma-Gandhi-Straße				
Germany	Düsseldorf	North Rhine-Westphalia	Mahatma-Gandhi-Straße				
Germany	Bonn	North Rhine-Westphalia	Gandhi Straße				
Germany	Stuttgart	Baden-Württemberg	Mahatma-Gandhi-Straße				
Hungary	Dunaújváros		Gandhi-Utca,				
Indonesia	Medan	North Sumatra	Jalan Gandhi				
Iran	Tehran	Tehran Province	North Gandhi, Tehran, Iran				
Iran	Tehran	Tehran Province	Gandhi Street, Tehran, Iran				
Italy	Milan	Milan Province	Via Mahatma Gandhi				
Jamaica	Kingston	Kingston-St. Andrew, Surrey County	Gandhi Road				
Jordan	Amman	-	Mahatma Gandhi Street Kenya Nairobi Gandhi Avenue. Nairobi west. Near Langata road	Lebanon	Beirut	-	Rue Mahatma Ghandi
Mauritius	Goodlands		Gandhi Road				
Mauritius	Roche Terre		S.I Gandhi Street				
Mauritius	Beau Bassin-Rose Hill		M. Gandhi Street				
Mauritius	Beau Bassin-Rose Hill		Mahatma Gandhi Lane				
Mauritius	Quatre Bornes		Gandhi Avenue				
Mauritius	Belle Rose		Gandhi Street				
Mexico	Mexico City		Calzada Mahatma Gandhi				
Mongolia	Ulaanbaatar		Mahatma Gandhi Street				
Morocco	Casablanca		Boulevard Gandhi				
Netherlands	Leiden		Gandhiburg				
Netherlands	Utrecht		Gandhidreef				
Netherlands	Delft		Gandhilaan				
Netherlands	Leiden		Gandhistraat				
Netherlands	Purmerend		Mahatma Gandhistraat				
Netherlands	Rotterdam		Mahatma Gandhistraat				
Netherlands	Culemborg		Gandhi				
Netherlands	Zaandam		Gandhihof				
Netherlands	Zeist		Gandhilaan				
Netherlands	Stadskanaal		Gandhiplein				
Netherlands	Maastricht		Gandhiplein				
Netherlands	Zetten		Gandhistraat				
Netherlands	Haarlem		Gandhistraat				
Netherlands	Hengelo(O)		Gandhistraat				
Netherlands	Hoofddorp		Gandhistraat				
Netherlands	Middelburg		Gandhistraat				
Netherlands	Epe		Gandhiweg				
Netherlands	Gouda		Gandhiweg				
Netherlands	Amsterdam		M. Gandhilaan				
Netherlands	Groningen		M. K. Gandhiplein				
Netherlands	Heerhugowaard		Mahatma Gandhihof				
Netherlands	Eindhoven		Mahatma Gandhilaan				
Netherlands	Zoetermeer		Mahatma Gandhisingel				
Netherlands	's-Gravenhage		Mahatma Gandhistraat				
Netherlands	Arnhem		Mahatma Gandhiweg				
Netherlands	Assen		Mahatma Gandhiweg				
Netherlands	Muntendam		Mahatma Gandhiweg				
Philippines	Manila		Mahatma Gandhi Street, Paco				
Poland	Warsaw	Masovian	Mahatmy Gandhiego				
Poland	Łódź	Łódź	Mohandasa Gandhiego				
Serbia	Blokovi		Gandijeva				
South Africa	Durban	KwaZulu-Natal	Mahatma Gandhi Road, Durban				
South Africa	Johannesburg	Gauteng	Gandhi Square				
Spain	Barcelona	Catalonia	Jardins de Gandhi				
Sri Lanka	Jaffna	Northern Province	Mahathma Gandhi Road				
Trinidad and Tobago	Debe	Penal–Debe, Victoria County	Gandhi Village Road				
Trinidad and Tobago	San Fernando	San Fernando, Victoria County	Gandhi Street				
Trinidad and Tobago	Saint Helena	Tunapuna–Piarco, Caroni County	Gandhi Street				
Turkey	Ankara		Mahatma Gandhi Caddesi 76				
Turkey	Ankara		Mahatma Gandhi Caddesi				
United Kingdom	London		Gandhi Close				
United Kingdom	Kingston upon Hull		Gandhi Way				
United States	Boulder, Colorado	Colorado	Gandhi Drive				
United States	Davie, Florida	Florida	Gandhi Street				
United States	Crawfordsville, Indiana	Indiana	Gandhi Street				
United States	Durham, North Carolina	North Carolina	Gandhi Drive				
United States	Fuquay-Varina, North Carolina	North Carolina	Gandhi Lane				
United States	Houston	Texas	Mahatma Gandhi District, Houston				
Uruguay	Montevideo	Montevideo Department	Rambla Mahatma Gandhi				

== See also ==
- Mehrauli-Gurgaon Road in Delhi is also abbreviated as MG Road
