= Hillcroft =

Hillcroft may refer to:

- Hillcroft Avenue
  - Mahatma Gandhi District a district of Houston, Texas, United States on Hillcroft Avenue
  - Hillcroft Transit Center Station, a proposed terminus of Houston METRORail's future University Line
- Hillcroft College, residential adult education college for women in South London, England
- Hillcroft Preparatory School, a former independent co-educational school in Suffolk, England
- Hillcroft School, a former boys' secondary school in South London, England
