= KD Singh Babu Stadium metro station =

Lucknow Metro's Red Line metro station

KD Singh Babu Stadium
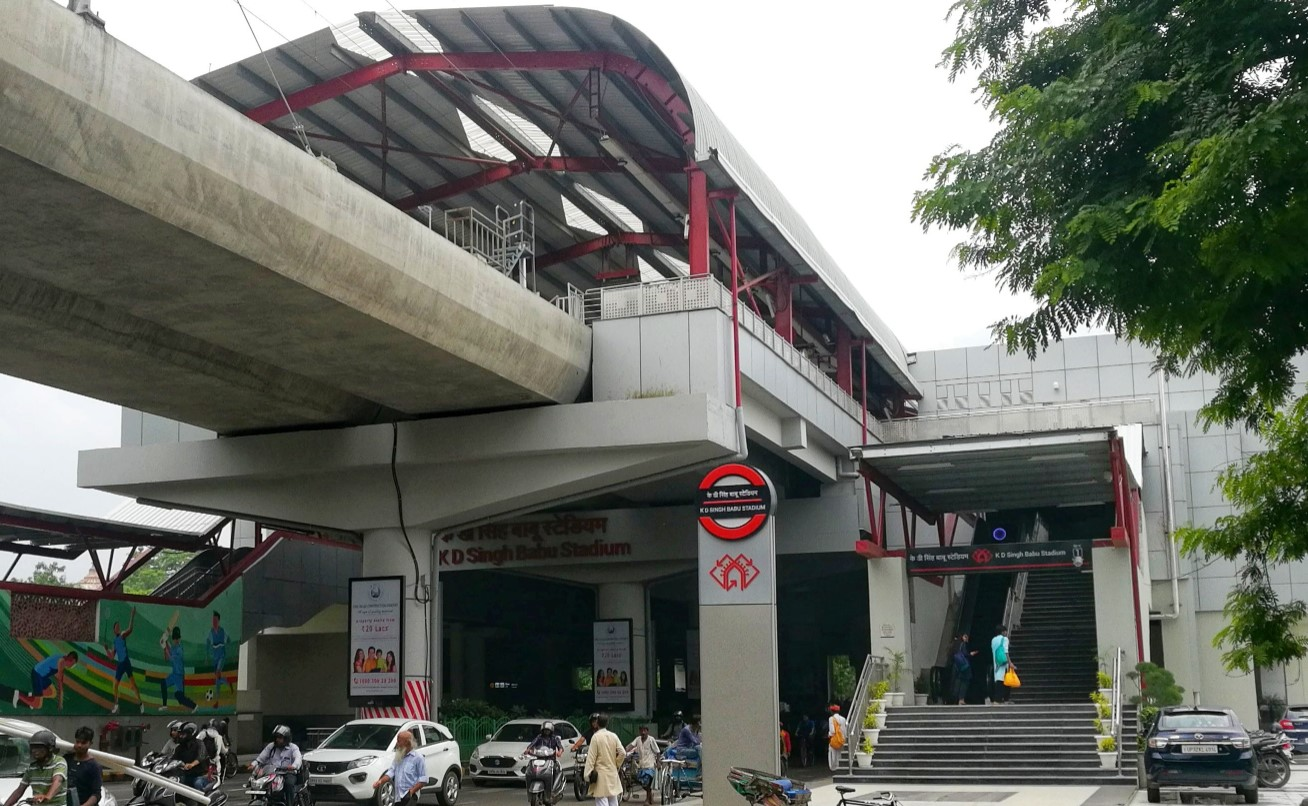
- The elevated metro above the Mahatma Gandhi Marg

General information
- Location: Kaiserbagh Officer's Colony, Qaisar Bagh, Lucknow, Uttar Pradesh 226001
- Coordinates: 26.8539°N 80.9367°E
- System: Lucknow Metro station
- Owner: Lucknow Metro
- Operator: Uttar Pradesh Metro Rail Corporation
- Line: Red Line
- Platforms: Side platform Platform-1 → Munshi Pulia; Platform-2 → CCS International Airport
- Tracks: 2
- Connections: K. D. Singh Babu Stadium, Lucknow

Construction
- Structure type: Elevated, Double track
- Platform levels: 2

History
- Opened: 8 March 2019; 7 years ago
- Electrified: Single-phase 25 kV 50 Hz AC through overhead catenary

Services
| Preceding station | Lucknow Metro | Following station |
|---|---|---|
| Hazratganj towards CCS International Airport | Red Line | Vishwavidyalaya towards Munshi Pulia |
Route map
Location

KD Singh Babu Stadium is an elevated metro station on the North-South Corridor of the Red Line of Lucknow Metro in Lucknow, Uttar Pradesh, India. It was opened to the public on 8 March 2019.

The K. D. Singh Babu Stadium facility lies towards the east of the station.

== Station layout ==
| G | Street level | Exit/Entrance |
| L1 | Mezzanine | Fare control, station agent, Metro Card vending machines, crossover |
| L2 | Side platform | Doors will open on the left |
| L2 | Platform 2 Southbound | Towards → CCS International Airport; Next Station: Hazratganj |
| L2 | Platform 1 Northbound | Towards ← Munshi Pulia; Next Station: Vishwavidyalaya |
| L2 | Side platform | Doors will open on the left |
| L2 |

== See also ==
- Lucknow
- List of Lucknow Metro stations
- Uttar Pradesh State Road Transport Corporation
- Rapid Transit in India
- List of metro systems
