= Kodialbail =

- Locality
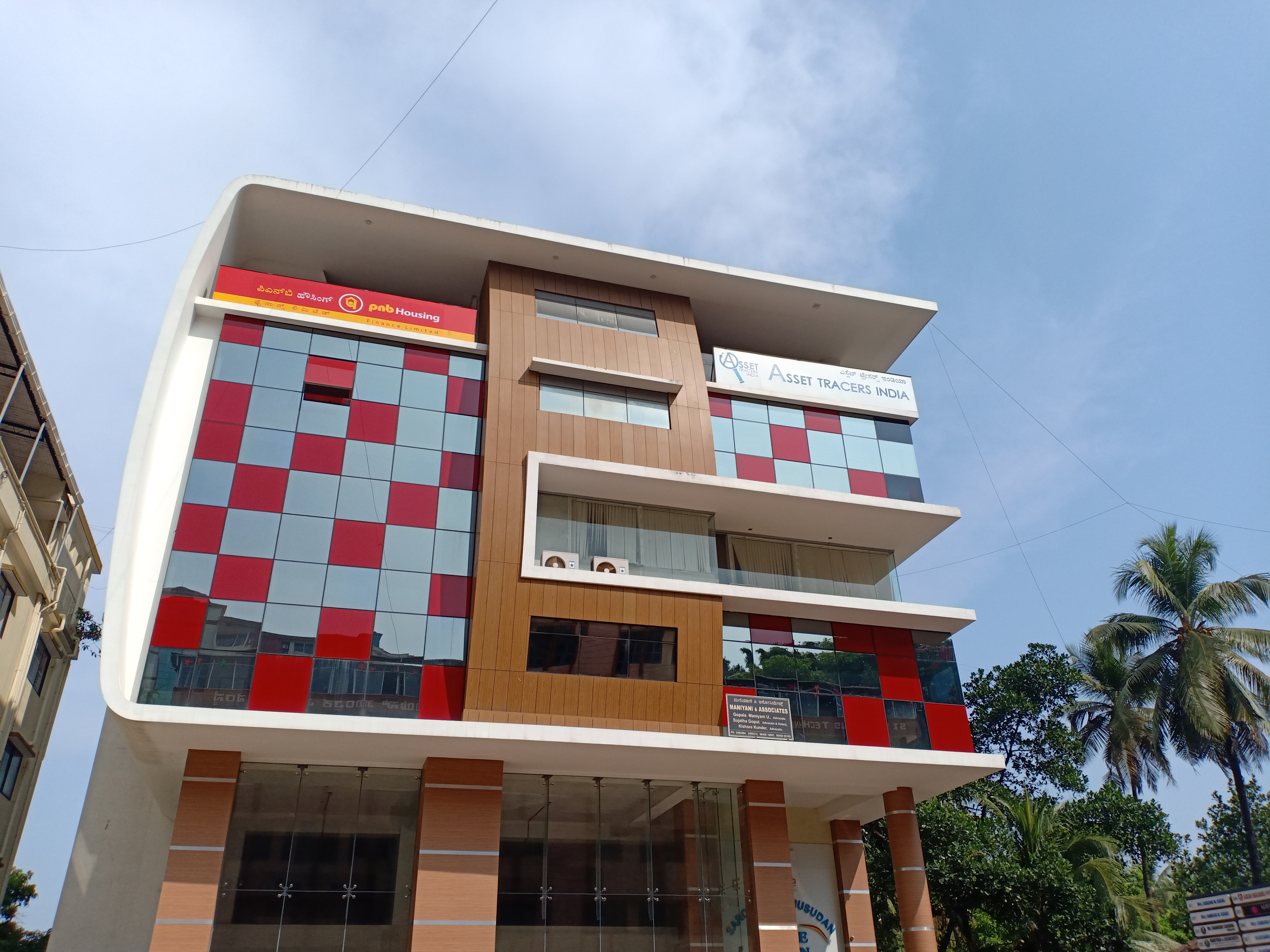
- Sarojini Madhusudan Kushe Sadan building at Kodialbail locality in Mangalore
- Interactive map of Kodialbail
- Coordinates: 12.875317°N 74.83851°E
- Country: India
- State: Karnataka
- District: Dakshina Kannada
- City: Mangalore
- Elevation: 22 m (72 ft)
- Time zone: UTC+5:30 (IST)
- Postal code: 575003

Kodialbail is a locality in the city of Mangalore in Karnataka state of India. It is located 2 km to the north of Hampankatta. It is home to some of the most prestigious educational institutes of Mangalore as well as the Mangalore Stock Exchange.

== Education ==
- Besant Institutions
  - Besant Evening College
  - Besant National Girl's High School
- Canara Institutions
  - Canara College
  - Canara Pre-University College
- Sharada Institutions
  - Sharada Vidyalaya (Affiliated to CBSE)
  - Sharada Pre-University College
- St. Aloysius ITI
- SDM College of Law & Business Management

== Friend's Club ==
- KodialBail Friend's
  - Sarvajanika Satyanarayana Pooja Samiti Kodial-Bail
  - Sarvajanika Ganeshotsava Samiti Kodial-Bail 2002–present

== Healthcare ==
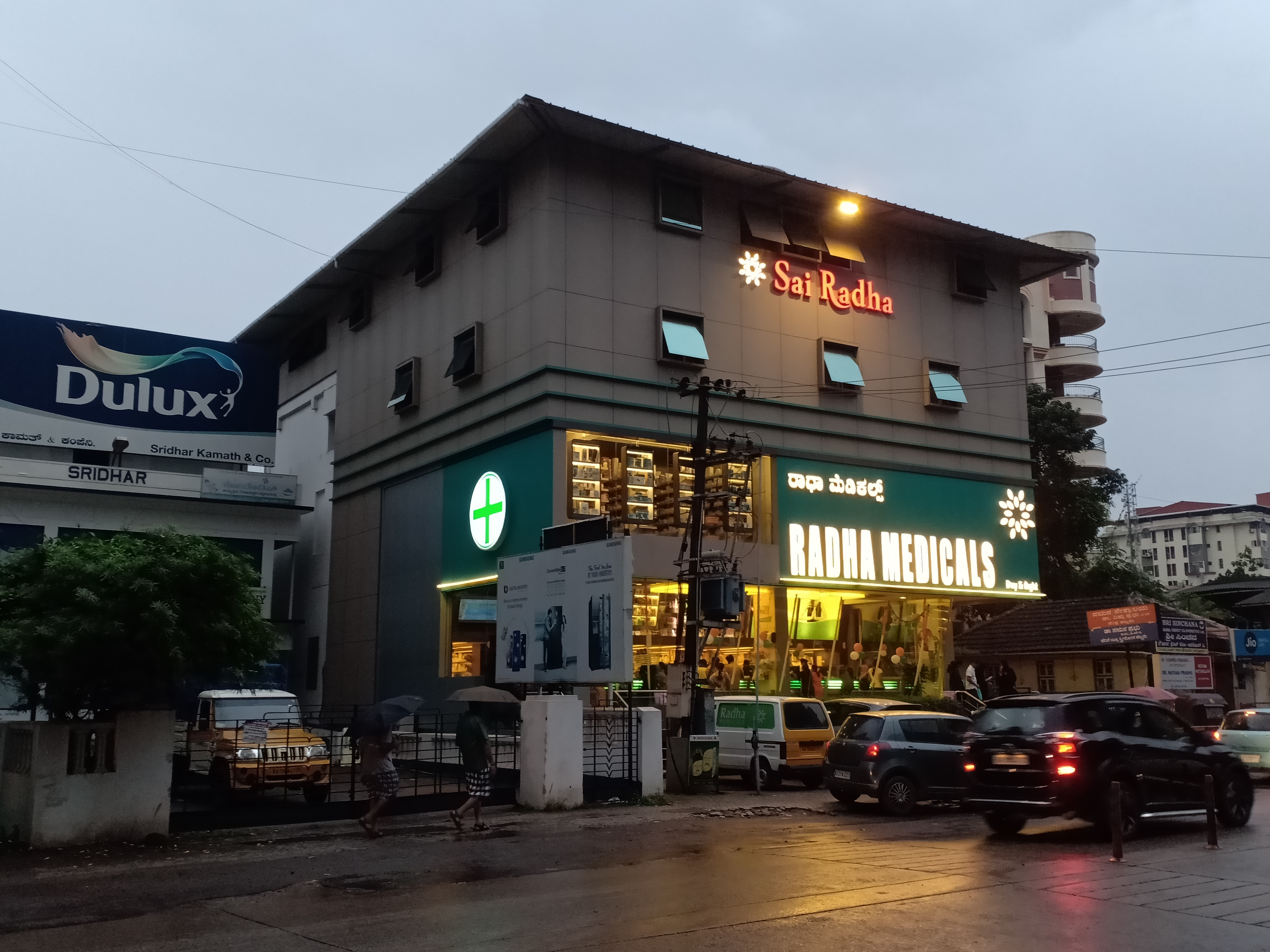
Radha Medicals at Karangalpady in Kodialbail locality of Mangalore

- Yenepoya Hospital
- Densure Dental Clinic

== Business ==
- TMA Pai International Convention Centre
- Mangalore Stock Exchange

== Leisure ==
- City Center Mall (1 km towards Hampankatta)
- Empire Mall
- The Ocean Pearl
- Sagar Ratna

== Other Places ==
- Bench Court
- District jail
