= Joginder Gahunia =

Indian-American businessman (1943–2002)

Joginder Singh Gahunia (August 25, 1943 – January 26, 2002) also known as Jogi Gahunia was an Indian-American businessman, co-founder of the South Asian Chamber of Commerce, and founder of the first North Indian fast-food restaurant in Houston, Raja Sweets. He was instrumental in the official designation of Houston's Mahatma Gandhi District.

== Early life and family ==
Gahunia was born on August 25, 1943, into a Punjabi Sikh family in the small village of Sujjon, Punjab, India, to Bachan Kaur (née Saini) and Puran Singh Gahunia. He attended Aria High School in Garshankar, Punjab. In 1966, he moved to London, England, where he pursued higher education and earned a bachelor's degree in electrical engineering from Isleworth College in Hounslow in 1970. On April 14, 1971, he married Resham Kaur (née Banwait) Gahunia. They had three children: Kiran, Sharan, and Roger (originally Raju).

Their oldest daughter, Kiran, was oxygen-deprived at birth and is permanently disabled. Their son anglicized his name from Raju to Roger and worked as an IT specialist at ExxonMobil for many years. Their daughter Sharan graduated from Sharpstown High School and the University of Houston, working for Continental Airlines customer service for 11 years before returning to work for Raja Sweets.

== Career ==
In 1973, he opened the restaurant "Away Fare" in Berkshire, England. In 1979, he immigrated to the United States and opened "The Front Row Restaurant" in Cleveland, Ohio. Seeking a warmer climate and better economic opportunities, he moved to Houston, Texas, in 1981 and became a real estate agent until 1985. He and his wife also worked at Burger King and Dunkin' Donuts to make ends meet.

In 1986, he opened the first North Indian fast-food restaurant and bakery in Houston, Raja Sweets. The restaurant became renowned for its freshly made sweets, affordability, and inclusive environment for those outside the South Asian community. Gahunia often provided food and sponsorships for local events and offered immigrants employment opportunities.

Gahunia and his wife continued to run the business and hired family members as chefs and employees. Gahunia added North Indian-style fast food to the menu. His wife, Resham, continued to insist on everything being made fresh, on-site, and daily, resisting simplifications of dishes or spices.

== Community involvement ==
Gahunia was a crucial figure in designating Hillcroft as the Mahatma Gandhi district, affectionately calling it "Little India." He was an active member of the local Indian community, often providing food or snacks for events. He frequently wrote checks for organizations' seed money, including funding what is now Masala Radio.

Gahunia was a founding member of the South Asian Chamber of Commerce and the Asian-American Political Caucus, a board member of the India Culture Center, and a member of the South Asian Political Action Committee. He was also an active member of the local Sikh community and former president of the Gurudwara Sahib of Houston.

He served on many host committees and supported and contributed to various political campaigns, including President Bill Clinton, Vice President Al Gore, Senator Phil Gramm, Governor Anne Richards, Mayor Lee Brown, and City Councilmen Michael Berry and Gordon Quan.

== Death ==
Gahunia died on January 26, 2002, from pancreatic cancer. His funeral service was held on January 30, 2002, at Brookside Memorial Park Crematory.
