= Mahatma Gandhi Road (Mangaluru) =

Road in Mangalore, India

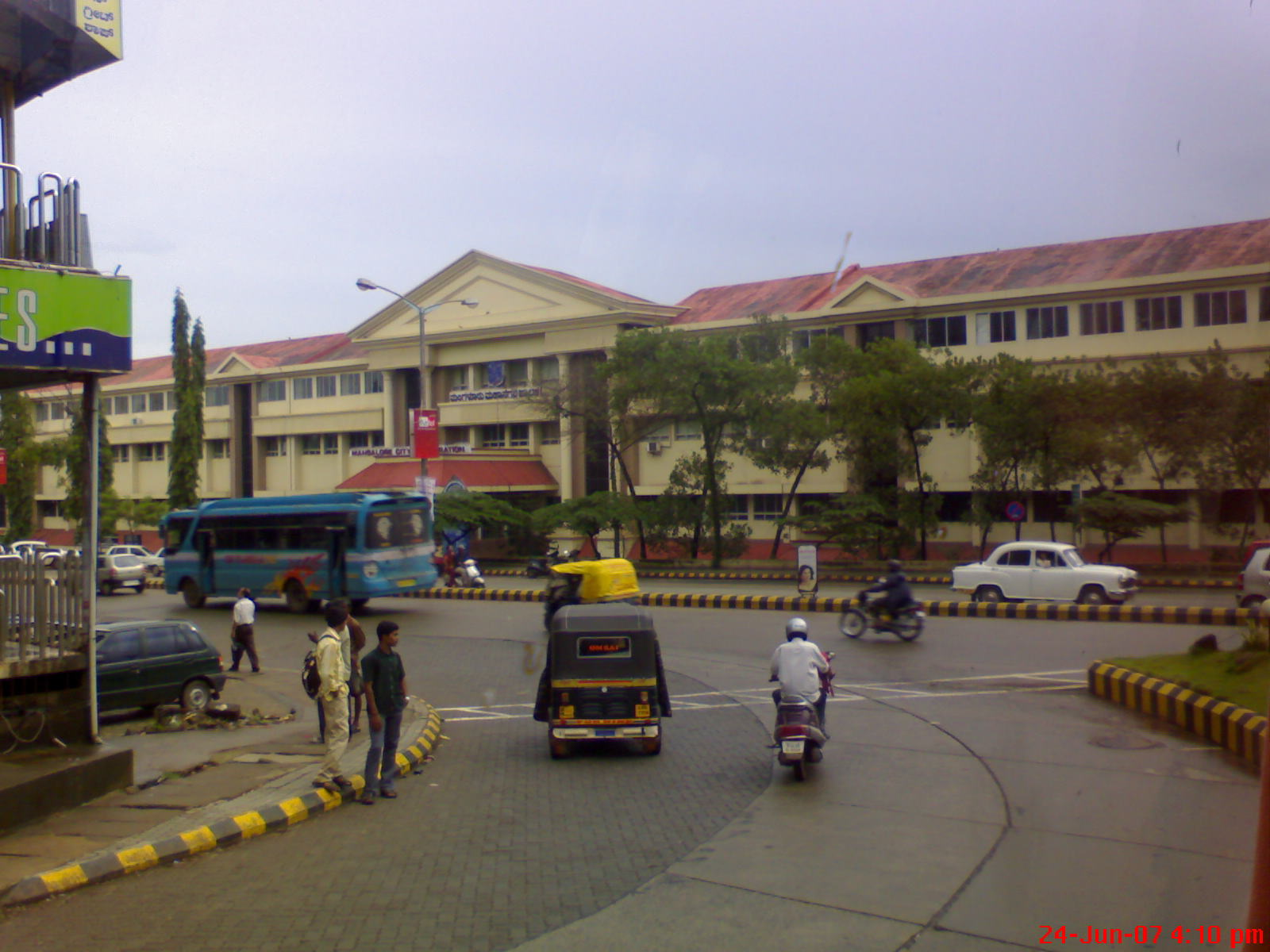
Mangaluru City Corporation, located at MG Road, Mangaluru

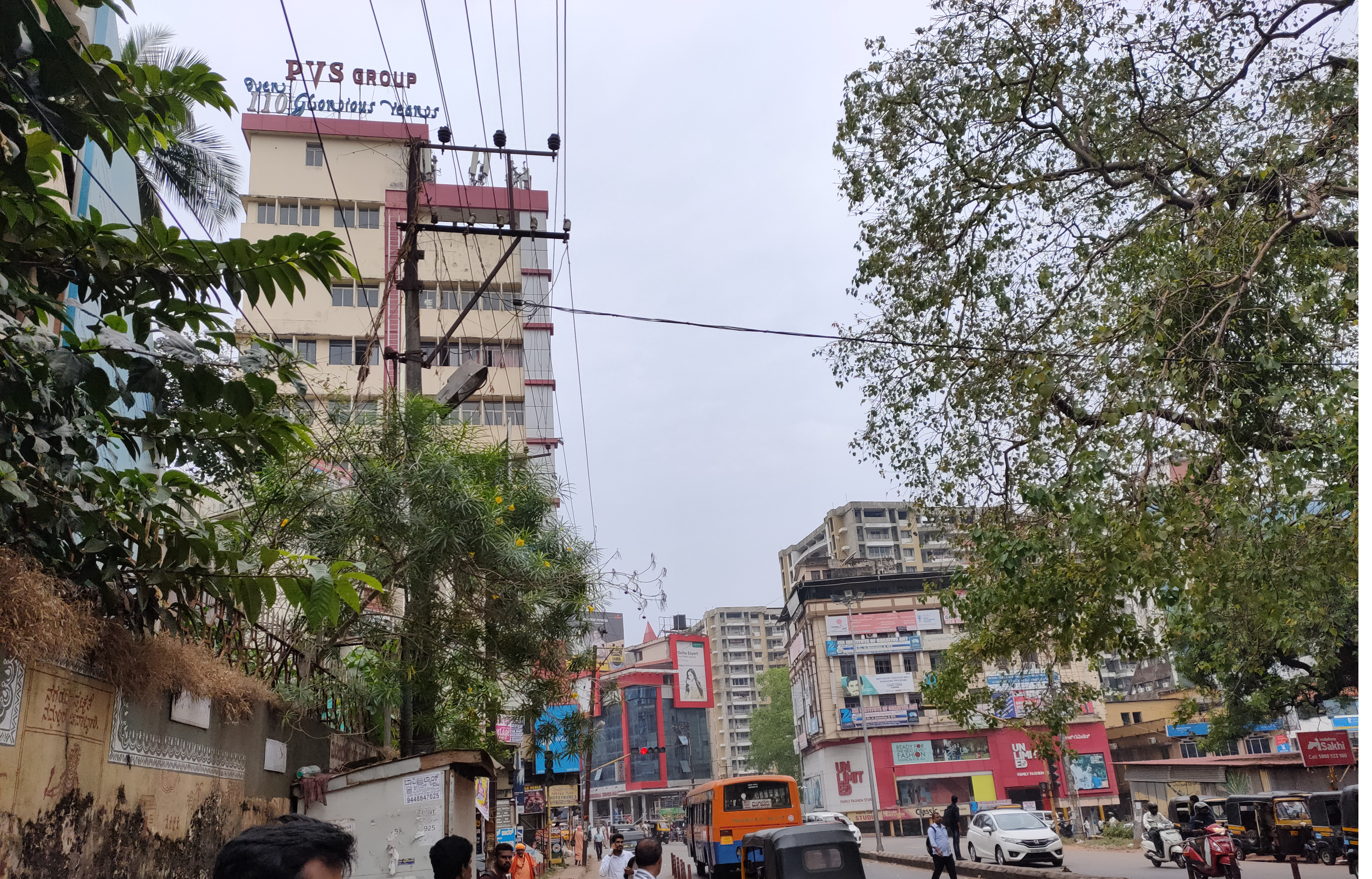
PVS Junction, MG Road, Mangaluru

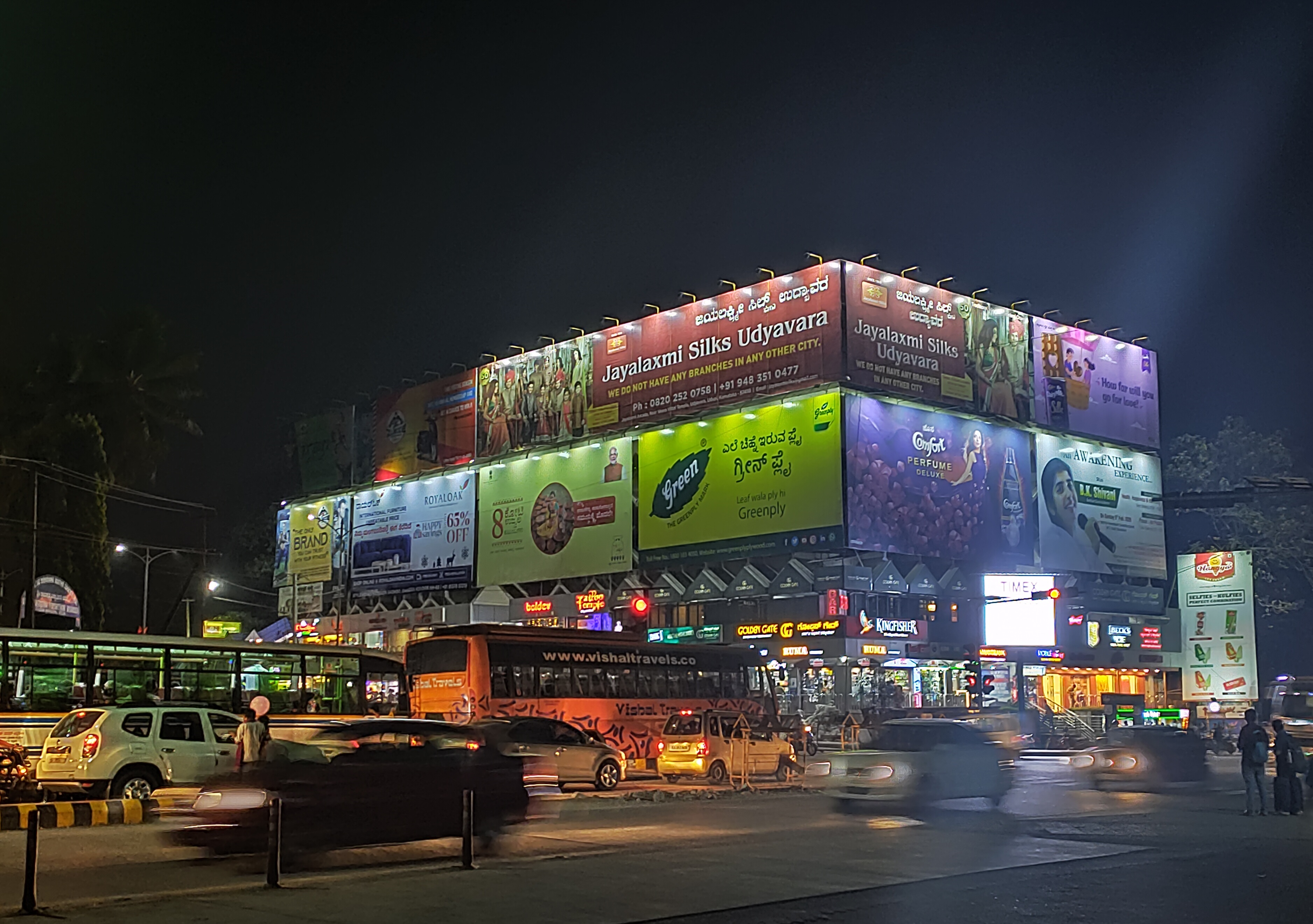
Saibeen Complex at night, Lalbagh Junction, MG Road, Mangaluru

Mahatma Gandhi Road, (M. G. Road for short), is a road situated in Kodialbail in the city of Mangaluru, India. Like most of its similarly named counterparts in other Indian cities, this road is in the heart of the city and is one of the busiest roads in Mangalore, consisting of shopping malls, educational institutions, media houses, government offices. M. G. Road starts at P. V. S. Circle and joins the Kulur Ferry Road near Lady Hill.

M. G. Road was named after the father of the nation Mahatma Gandhi.

== Educational Institutions ==
- S. D. M. Law College
- Canara College
- Shree Devi Education Trust

== Shopping malls and commercial buildings ==
- T. M. A. Pai International Convention Centre

== Government offices ==
- Mangaluru City Corporation

== Other Notable places ==
- Pabbas Ice Cream Parlour

== Gallery ==
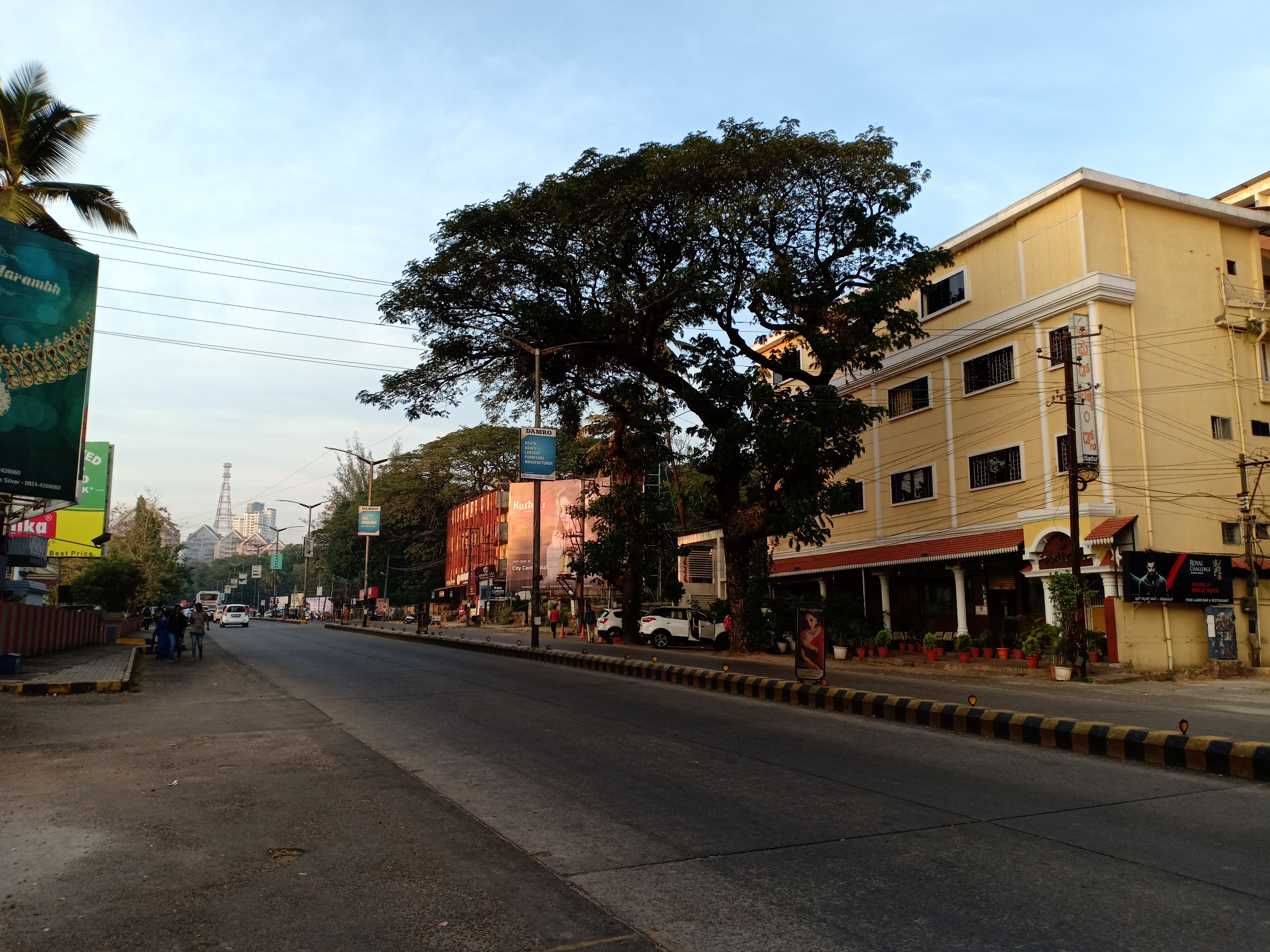
M.G. Road in Mangalore city

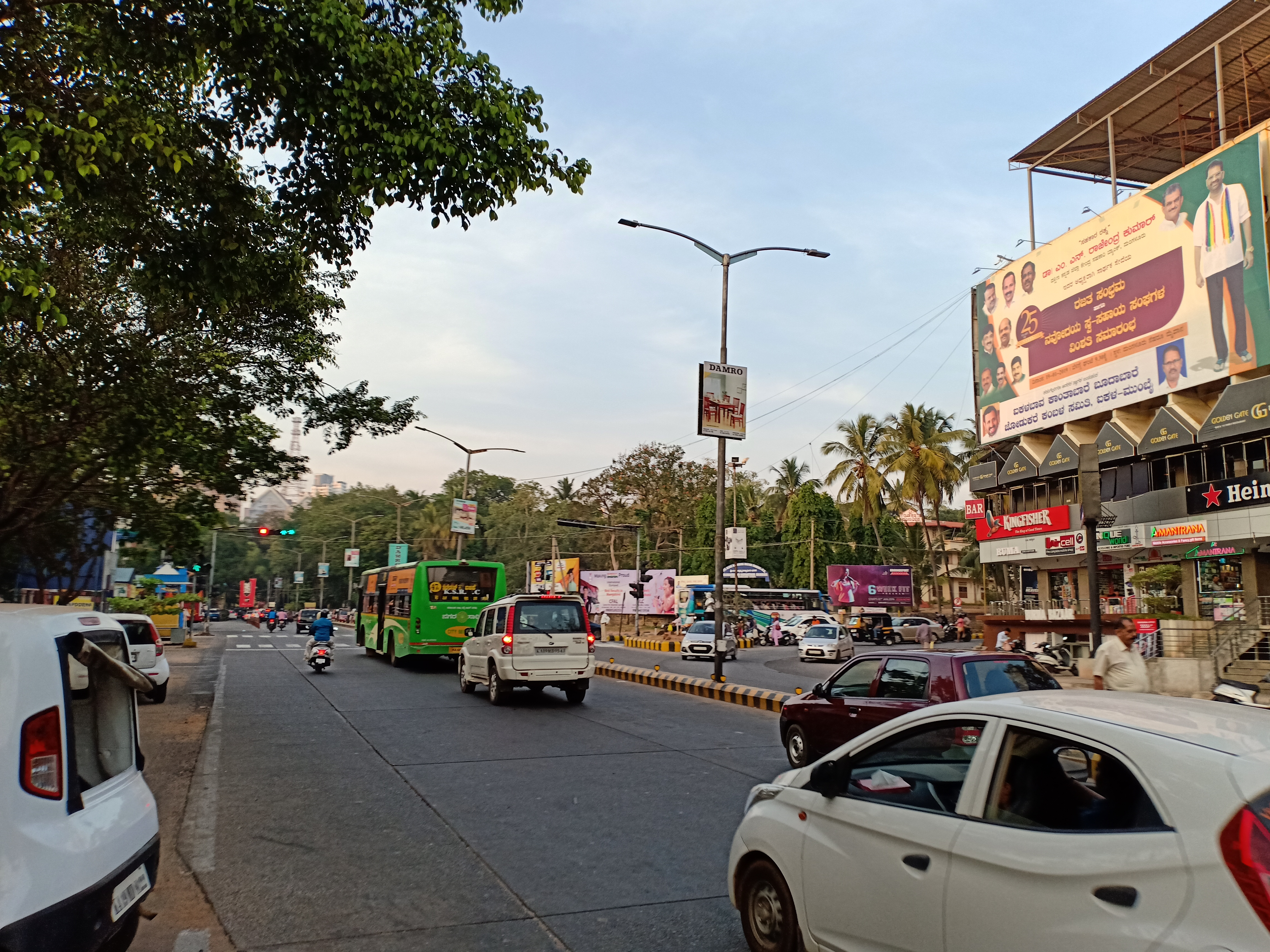
M.G. Road traffic signal in Mangalore
