= TMA Pai International Convention Centre =

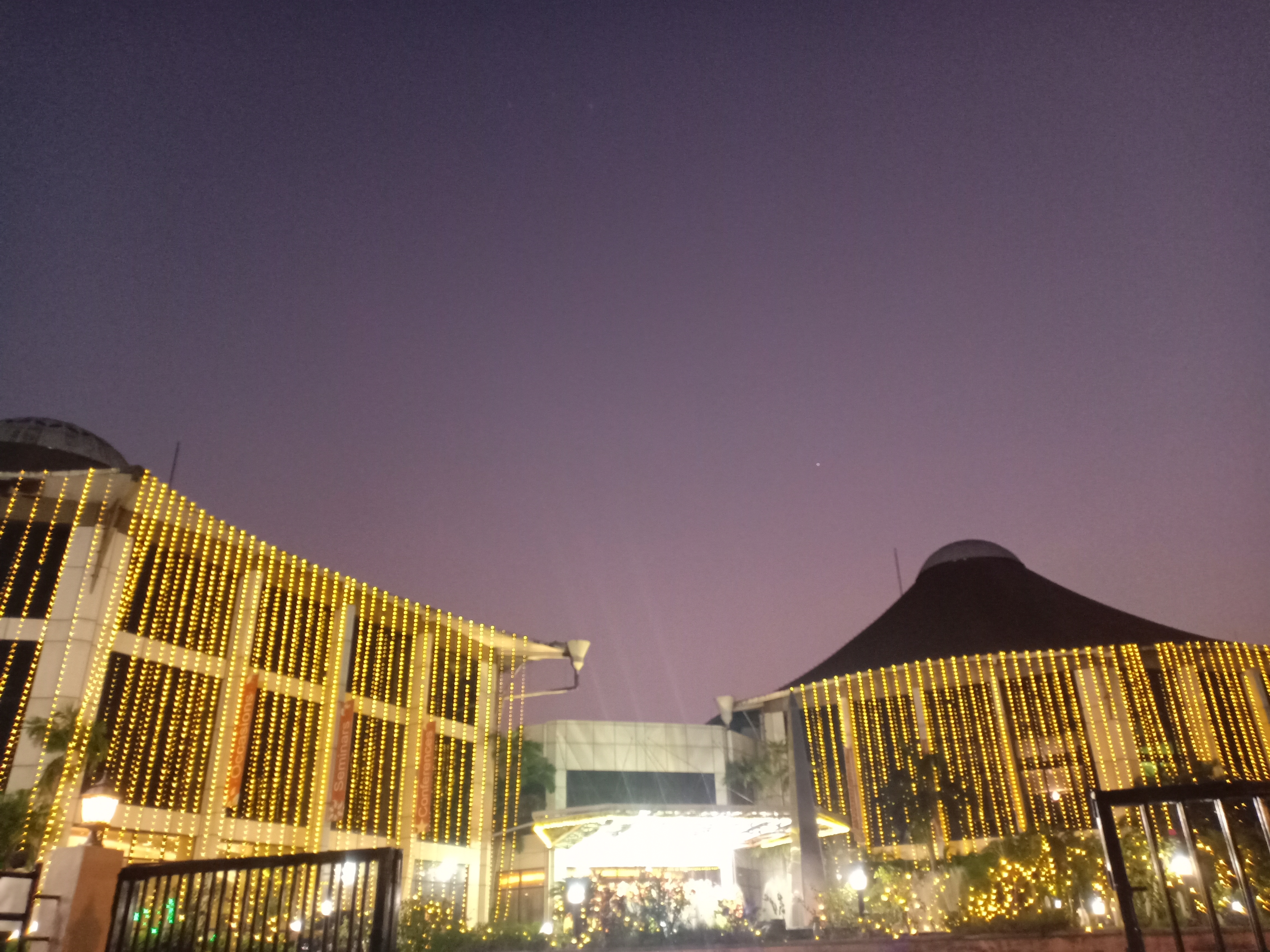
- TMA Pai International Convention Centre at MG Road in Mangaluru
- Location: (India) MG Road, Mangaluru, Karnataka
- Owner: Manipal Academy of Higher Education
- Operator: Manipal Academy of Higher Education
- Capacity: 4000+

Website
- TMA Pai Auditorium

TMA Pai International Convention Centre is a convention center owned by the Manipal Academy of Higher Education located in MG Road, Mangaluru. It is among the largest convention centers in India, with a seating capacity for more than 4000 people and an area of 16,730 square metres (180,100 sq ft).

The centre is named after T. M. A. Pai, the founder of Kasturba Medical College and Manipal Academy of Higher Education.

Its facilities include conference halls, an auditorium and an exhibition hall.
