= Ashok Marg =

- Length: 3.3 km (2.1 mi)
- Location: Lucknow
- Postal code: 226001
- South end: Hazratganj
- Major junctions: Sikandar Bagh Chauraha
- North end: Gol Market Chauraha

Ashok Marg is a road located in Lucknow, Uttar Pradesh in India, that travels through Hazratganj and Nishatganj. The road is 3.3 kilometres (2.1 mi) in length, it starts at Hazratganj Chauraha and ends at Gole Market Chauraha, Nishatganj.
