= Mangalore Stock Exchange =

Stock exchange in India

The Mangalore Stock Exchange Limited (MGSE) was a regional stock exchange located in Mangalore, Karnataka, India. It is under the ownership of Ministry of Finance, Government of India. It was incorporated on 31 July 1984 as a public limited company. The Exchange was recognised by the Central Government for an initial period of 5 years on 9 September 1985 under section 4 of the Securities Contracts (Regulation) Act, 1956 and later on the period of recognition was extended by one year, from 9 September 1990 to 8 September 1991. The last recognition was valid up to 8 September 2003. On 31 August 2004, SEBI decided to derecognize the Mangalore Stock Exchange.

Chief Minister S.M. Krishna laid the foundation stone for the new building of the Mangalore Stock Exchange (MgSE) at Kulur on September 28, 2001. The MgSE has been granted 3 acres (12,000 m^{2}) of land by the state government.

== See also ==
- List of stock exchanges in the Commonwealth of Nations
- List of South Asian stock exchanges
- National Stock Exchange of India
