= Mahatma Gandhi Road (Lucknow) =

Road in Lucknow, India

MG Road Lucknow is one of the busiest roads in Lucknow, India, with upmarket shopping arcades, office skyscrapers, pubs, bars, discos, hotels, coffee shops, hypermarkets and restaurants. It also has several state and national level institutions. It is the basic node of Hazratganj and breaks into several high end roads like Shahnajaf road, Sapru marg, Ashok Marg (the central business district of the city), etc.

== Form ==
It is a 4-laned one sided bustling road made of non-skid technology from France with rubber coating to prevent water logging and carved with ample amount of radium based signals.

It is 4 km long at stretch with roads leading to the main business and governmental district of the city form its downtown with high rises and skyscrapers. It extends from the Cantonement area of Lucknow up to the Old city area, making it one of the major roads in the city.
