= Mahatma Gandhi Marg (Indore) =

Road in Indore, India

Mahatma Gandhi Road

Route information
- Length: 8.6 km (5.3 mi)

Major junctions
- East end: Palasia
- West end: Devi Ahilyabai Holkar International Airport

Location
- Country: India
- States: Madhya Pradesh
- Primary destinations: East Indore, West Indore and Central City

Highway system
- Roads in India; Expressways; National; State; Asian

MG Road or Mahatma Gandhi Road formerly known as James Street is one of the busiest roads of the city of Indore and a foremost shopping district in the city. It is spread over 8.6 km. Starting from Devi Ahilyabai Holkar International Airport it leads to the life line of city i.e. A.B. Road on Palasia Square. Major landmarks include Indore High Court, Regal Square, Gandhi Hall, Treasure Island, Chhappan Dukaan, Jail Road, Kothari Market, Rajwada and Khajuri Bazaar.

== Major Junctions ==
=== Aerodrome ===
Western terminal point of M.G. Road where it meets with a link road to National Highway 59 and Supper Corridor which is an upcoming hub for IT mega campus like TCS SEZ, Infosys SEZ and new sport complex.

Landmarks: Bijasan Tekri, Gommat Giri, Devi Ahilyabai Holkar International Airport

=== Bada Ganpati ===
Intersection of M.G. Road and Netaji Subhash Chandra Marg locally known as Bada Ganpati Square is a busy junction with commercial and religious traffic due to famous temple of bada ganpati on the junction.

Landmarks: Bada Ganpati Mandir

=== Malharganj ===
Oldest market and one of the most dense areas of Indore where M.G. Road become narrow due to congestion and heavy markets Cloth Market, Seetla mata market, Sarafa and many more.

Landmarks: Sarafa, Chhipa bakhal

=== Rajwada ===
Centre of Indore and adjoining State Highway 27 to Ujjain and connect north city to south city. It is the busiest pedestrian junction on M.G Road and in Indore too.

Landmarks: Rajwada, Khajuri Bazaar, Krishnapura chattris and Khan river.

=== Regal ===
A huge round about after which 2 lane M.G. Road turns into a six lane express road. The circle connect east city to west and old to new. Major road intersecting on Regal Junction and adjoining areas are R.N.T Marg (towards Devi Ahilya Vishwavidyalaya), Station Road (towards Indore Junction), Nehru Park Road and Prince Yeshwant Road (toward Holkar Cricket Stadium).

Landmarks: Regal Cinemas, Central Mall, Central Library, Indore High Court

=== Indraprasth ===
A junction with big malls, branded showrooms and wide roads make M.G. Road a fashion street.

Landmarks: Pizza Hut, Pantaloons, Big Bazaar, Treasure Island, Indraprasth Mall, Apollo Tower Mall, Globus Mall, PVR Cinemas, McDonald's, etc.

Many Indian cities have an MG road, and in general there is no linkage between these various roads (except that in many cases, these happen to be one of the busiest parts of the city).
