= Hillcroft Avenue =

Hillcroft Avenue is an arterial road in western Houston, Texas, United States. The street spans 8 miles (13 km) and is between Beltway 8 (South) and Westheimer Road. To the south Hillcroft has a wide boulevard, and many single family homes surround Hillcroft; some subdivisions use fences and shrubs as a barrier between Hillcroft and the houses. To the north Hillcroft is surrounded by strip centers and multifamily developments. Hillcroft runs through Brays Oaks (Fondren Southwest), Gulfton, and the Mahatma Gandhi District.

Bob Stein, the dean of the School of Social Sciences of Rice University, said "Hillcroft is disorganized but not necessarily unorganized development. It is what Houston is all about. When you go from one end of Hillcroft to the other end, you cross every ethnic and racial group in our city. As a result, I want to say it is a microcosm." Tara Dooley of the Houston Chronicle described Hillcroft as "pure Houston, created with dedication to the automobile and an aversion to zoning."

== History ==
In the 2000s the India Culture Center and several South Asian merchants originally wanted to rename a stretch of Hillcroft Avenue to Mahatma Gandhi Avenue; however that required signatures of 75% of commercial property owners of the given part of the street. Manisha Gandhi Mehta, a spokesperson for the opening event that was held on January 16, 2010, said that the organizers of the district found difficulty in getting non-South Asian merchants to agree to the renaming of the street. In 2009 the head members of the India Culture Center and several South Asian merchants agreed to pay $10,000 for the street signage that designates the area as the Mahatma Gandhi District.

The first section of Hillcroft Avenue, between Bellaire Boulevard and what is now Bissonnet Street, was built in the mid-1950s as part of the Sharpstown development. It initially featured a ditch in the median which was covered in the late 1970s.

Throughout 2010, Hillcroft Avenue was fully reconstructed between Bellaire Boulevard and the Southwest Freeway (US 59). This section was widened from six lanes to eight lanes and was completed in October. The road's exceptionally wide right-of-way (140 feet (43 meters) allowed for this widening while maintaining a landscaped median.
