= Mahatma Gandhi District, Houston =

Ethnic enclave in Houston, Texas, US

Coordinates: 29.720°N 95.501°W

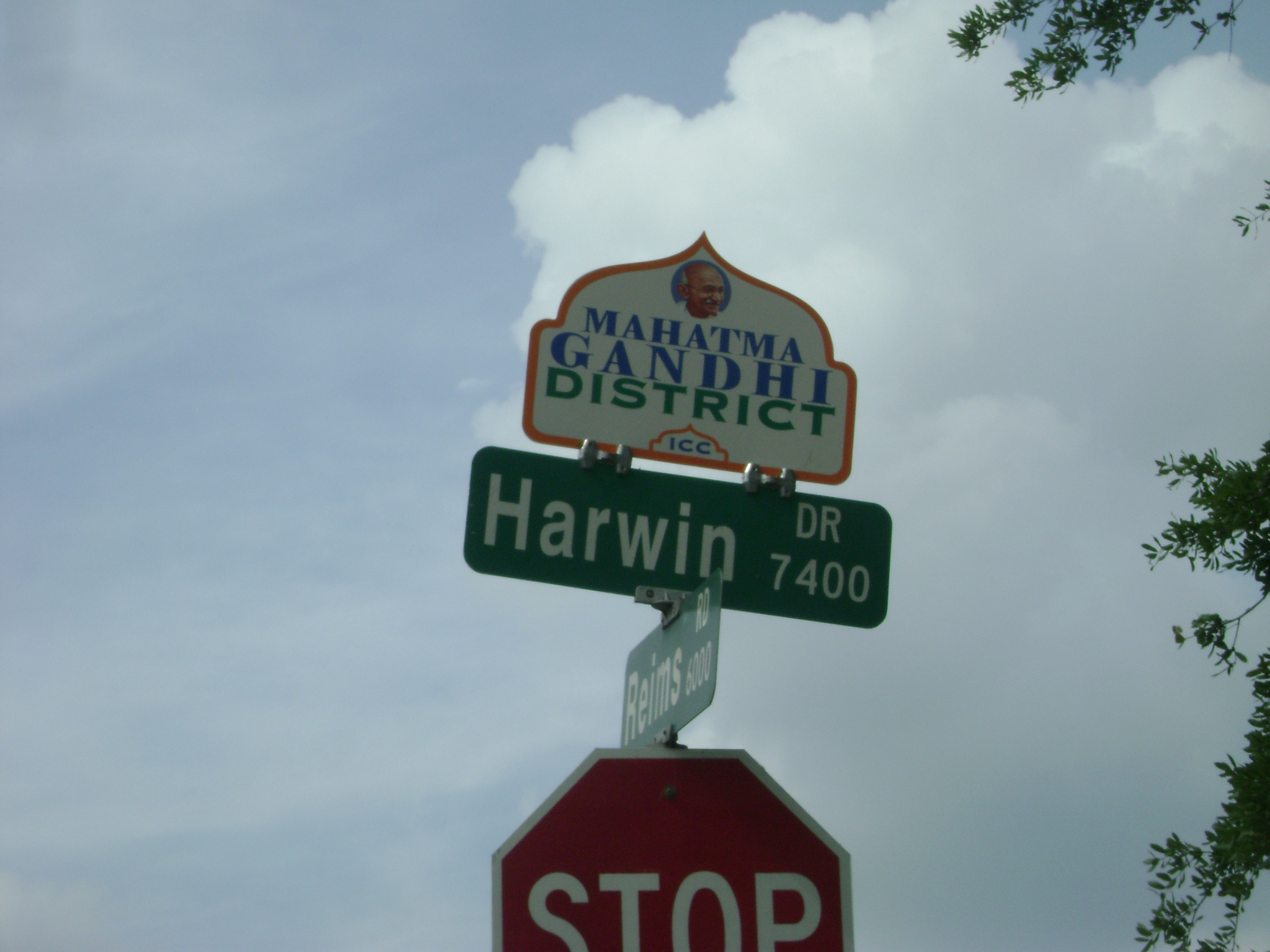
Placards such as this one were placed above street signs at the district's official naming ceremony on January 16, 2010.

The Mahatma Gandhi District (popularly known as Harwin, Hillcroft or occasionally Little India) is an ethnic enclave in Houston, Texas, United States, named after Mahatma Gandhi, consisting predominantly of Indian and Pakistani restaurants and shops and having a large South Asian population. The area is commonly referred to by locals as "Harwin," after Harwin Drive, a major thoroughfare which houses much of the Mahatma Gandhi district, and "Hillcroft", after Hillcroft Avenue, the road which intersects with I-69, is the main entrance to the district for the population in Sugar Land and Missouri City, and hosts many of the popular south Asian businesses in the district.

== History ==
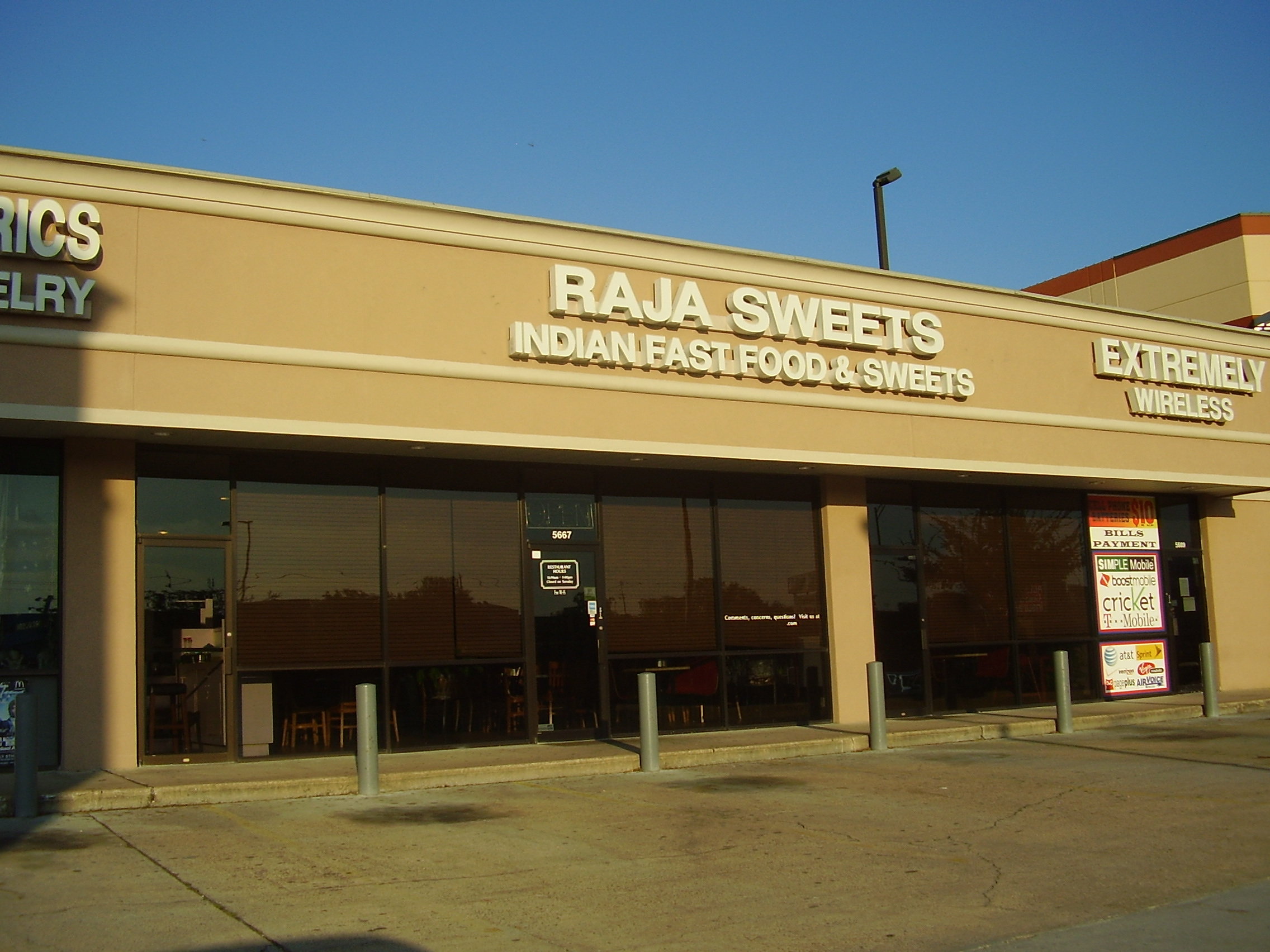
Raja Sweets

In 1983 Rupa Vyas, owner of Indian-American grocery store Jay Stores, moved the store from Rice Village to the Hillcroft area. Soon after, in 1985, the Gahunias, an Indian American family, opened Raja Sweets. The founder of the business was Joginder "Yogi" Gahunia (died 2002). Within a three-year period, India Grocers opened a location in the area. As time passed, more and more Indian American and Pakistani American businesses moved to the area. Existing Indian American businesses in the area expanded.

While being made up of Indian shops and having a large Indian population for a long time, it was not officially named until January 16, 2010 when the City of Houston held a naming ceremony. The Mayor of Houston, Annise Parker, and the Consul General of India in Houston, Sanjiv Arora, announced the name change. The Indian American community proposed marking the area as a South Asian enclave for a seven-year period until the founding of the Gandhi District. The India Culture Center and several South Asian merchants originally wanted to rename a stretch of Hillcroft Avenue to Mahatma Gandhi Avenue; however that required signatures of 75% of commercial property owners of the given part of the street. Manisha Gandhi Mehta, a spokesperson for the opening event that was held on January 16, 2010, said that the organizers of the district found difficulty in getting non-South Asian merchants to agree to the renaming of the street. In 2009 the head members of the India Culture Center and several South Asian merchants agreed to pay $10,000 for the street signage that designates the area as the district.

== Cityscape ==
The district is along Hillcroft Avenue, bordered by U.S. Highway 59 (Southwest Freeway) to the south and the Westpark Tollway to the north. Katharine Shilcut of the Houston Press said that "[t]he three roads combine in such a way as to form a little triangle within the tangle of streets and strip malls,[...]" Aku Patel, the owner of Karat 22, a jewelry store, said that continued development along Hillcroft was going to happen, but that the district would find difficulty in expanding to the other side of U.S. Highway 59 (Southwest Freeway) because a large Hispanic and Latino American population is already there. Patel said that instead the district will expand along Harwin Drive in an east-west direction.

Shilcut said that the Gandhi District's central location within the City of Houston, the district's increased visibility, and the increase in Greater Houston's Indian American and Pakistani American population caused the district to prosper. Yatin Patel, a Zambian-born ethnic Indian who is the owner of India Grocers, said in a 2011 Houston Press article that originally the Gandhi district did not have a significant Indian-American presence and consisted of several Indian stores and restaurants.

== Economy ==
Since the Indian and Pakistani businesses moved to the district, it became a center for the sale of Indian cuisine, Bollywood films, saris, and gold jewelry. Katharine Shilcutt of the Houston Press said that the high education and income levels of Indian Americans caused businesses in the district to thrive. Shilcut added that "it was clear the rest of the city had taken note" when the district received its formal name. Lynn Ghose Cabrera, the cofounder of "Desi Living," a blog covering Greater Houston's South Asian diaspora, said that "If you talk to longtime Houston Desi residents, they'll tell you that the establishment of the Hillcroft area as the 'Gandhi District' is a milestone. It's one signifier among many that as a community, we've come of age."

Yatin Patel said in a 2011 Houston Press article that as of that year, about 20–25% of his business originates from people who are not ethnic Indians. He attributes the increased business from non-Indians to the increased proliferation and exposure of Indian cuisine in the United States and his store's Caribbean and English products. Sharan Gahunia, a member of the Gahunia family, said that by 2011 Raja Sweets had a lot of African American, Chinese American, and Latino American customers even though her restaurant does not Americanize the food. After the owners of Raja Sweets decided that they needed to designate a day off and the restaurant began closing on Tuesdays, other Indian restaurants on Hillcroft began closing on Tuesdays.

In 2016 Emma Green of The Atlantic wrote that due to high levels of competition, restaurants tended to focus on employing other family members.

== Institutions ==
The India Culture Center is in the district.

== Legacy ==
Mayor of Houston Annise Parker designated January 16, 2010 as "Mahatma Gandhi District Day".

== Gallery ==
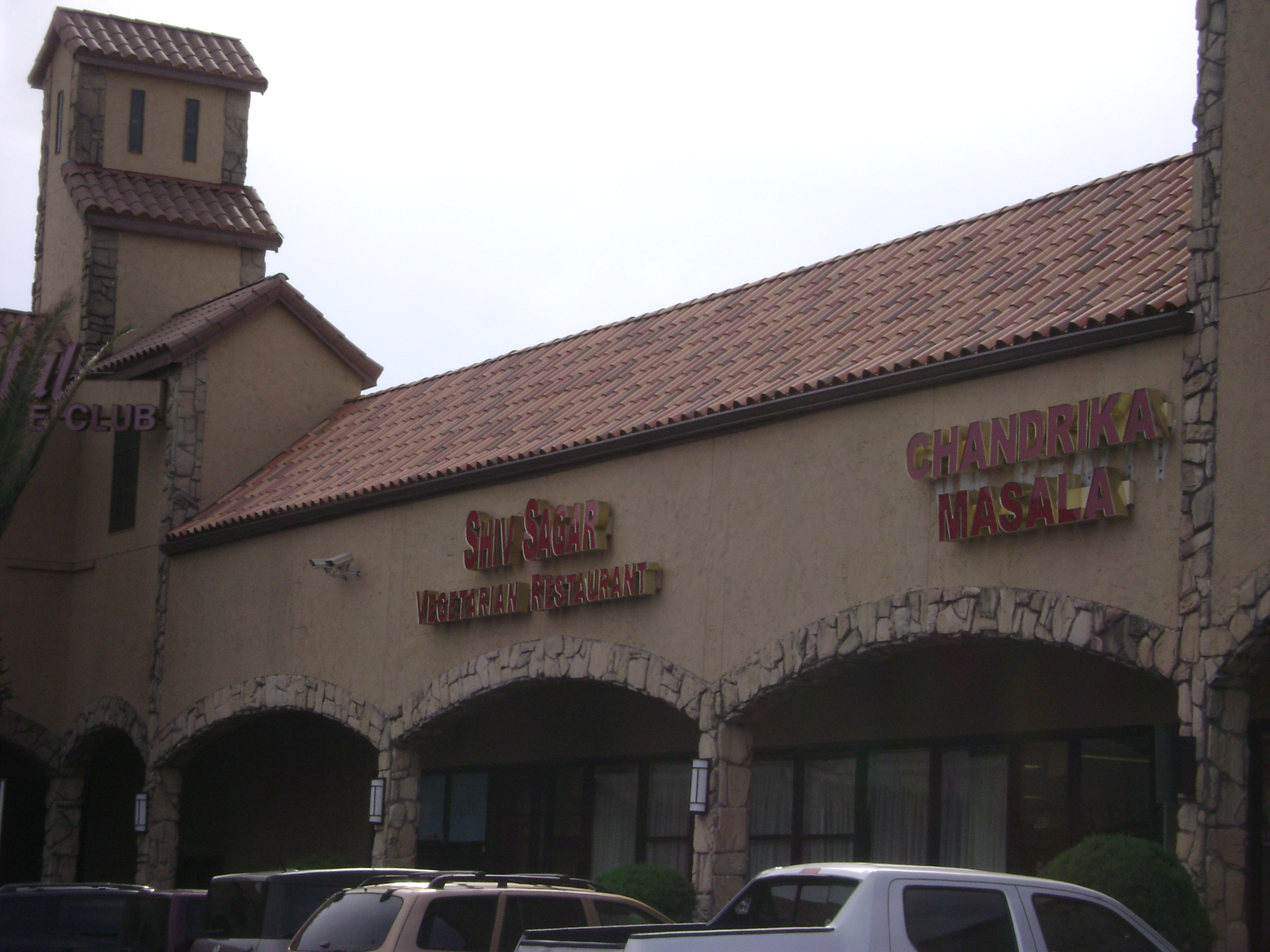
A strip-mall in the Mahatma Gandhi District - The Olympic Center with ample Indian and Pakistani retail shops and restaurants.

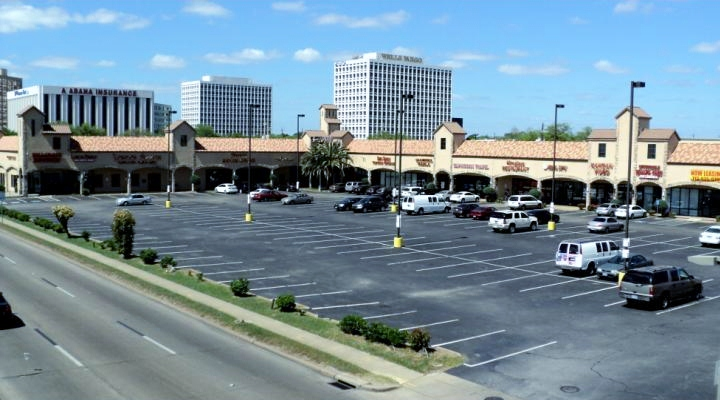
The Olympic Center 6600 Southwest Freeway

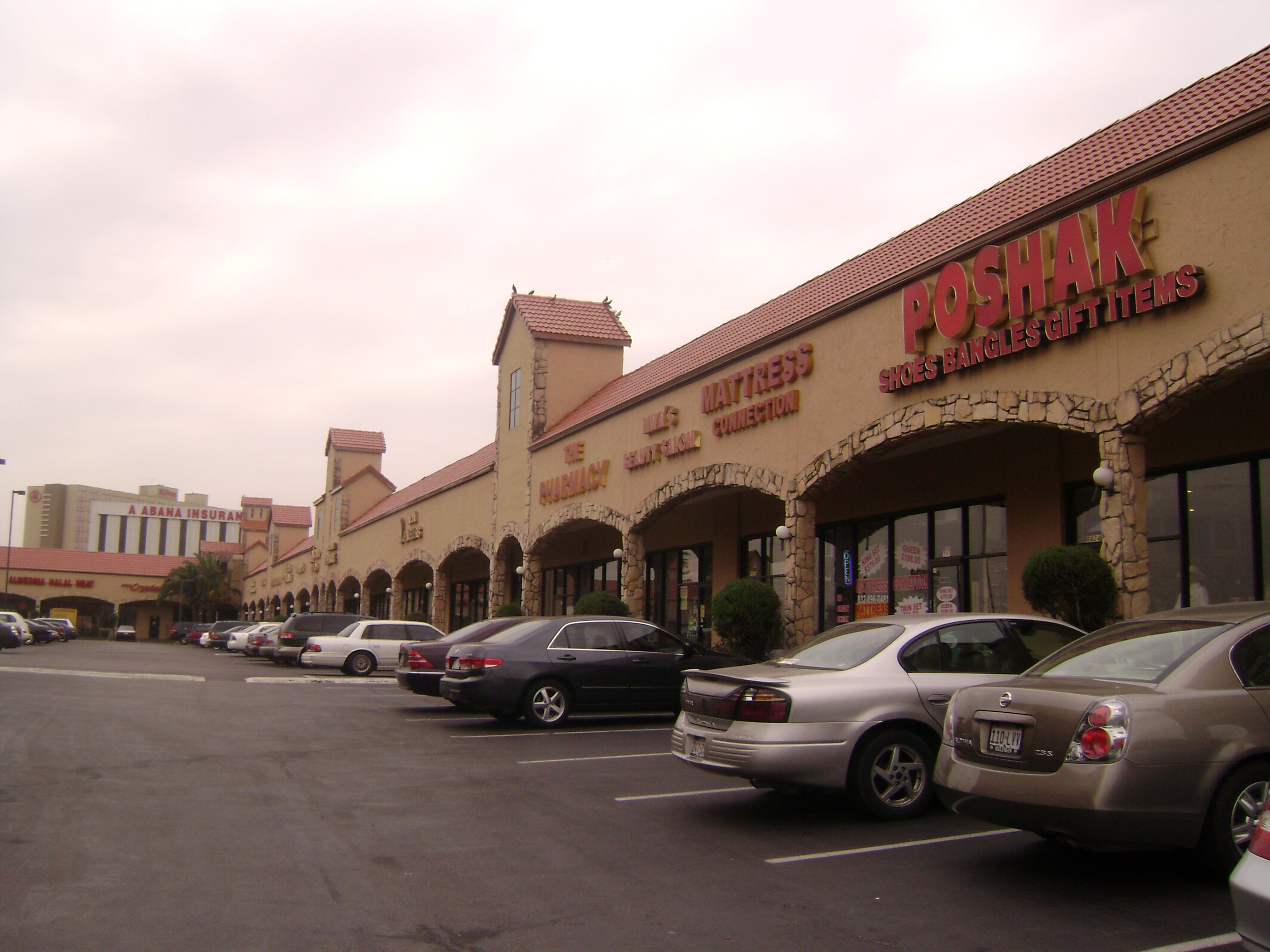
The Olympic Center 6600 Southwest Freeway

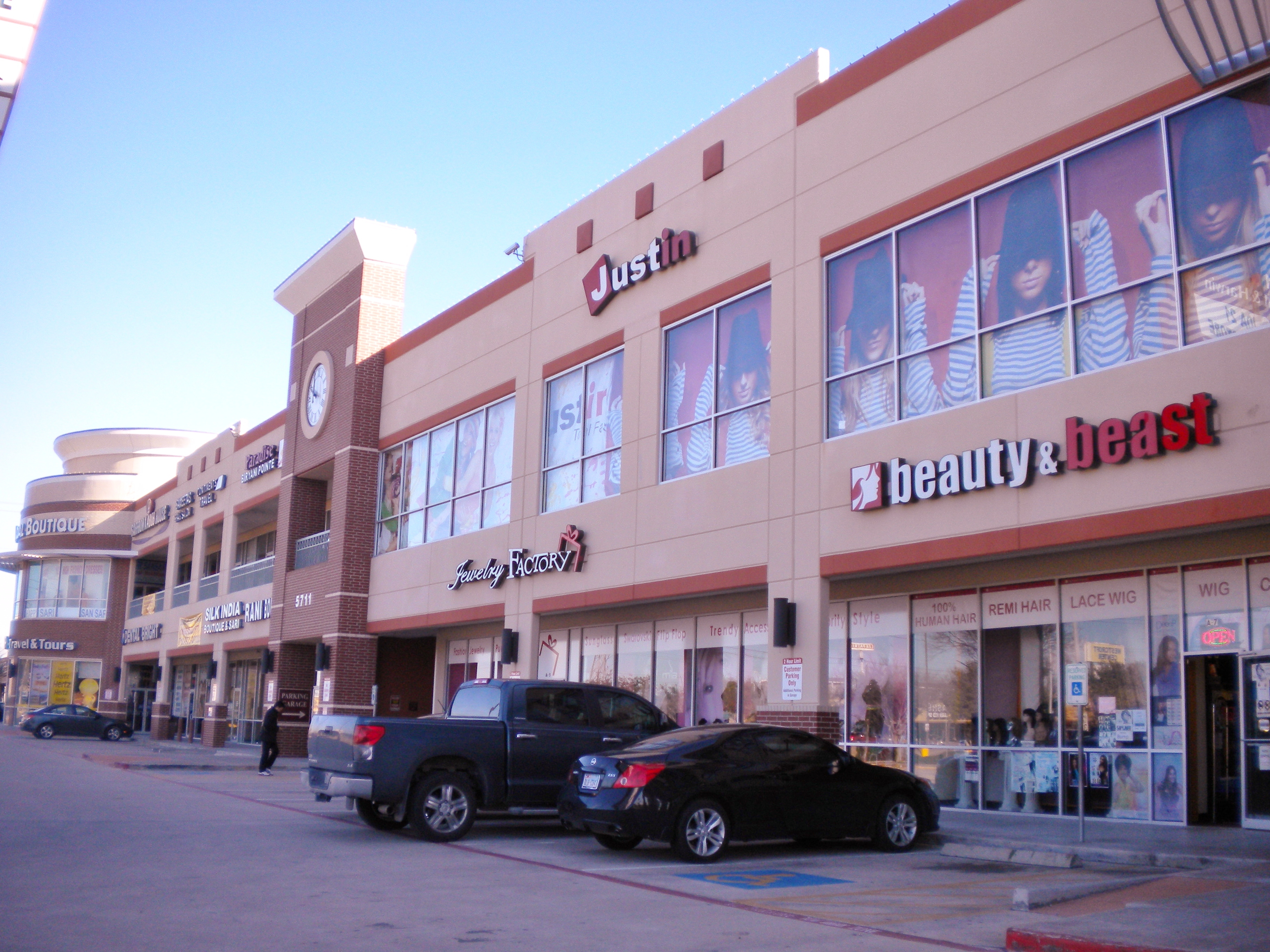
The Plaza @ Hillcroft & Hawrin5711 Hillcroft St.

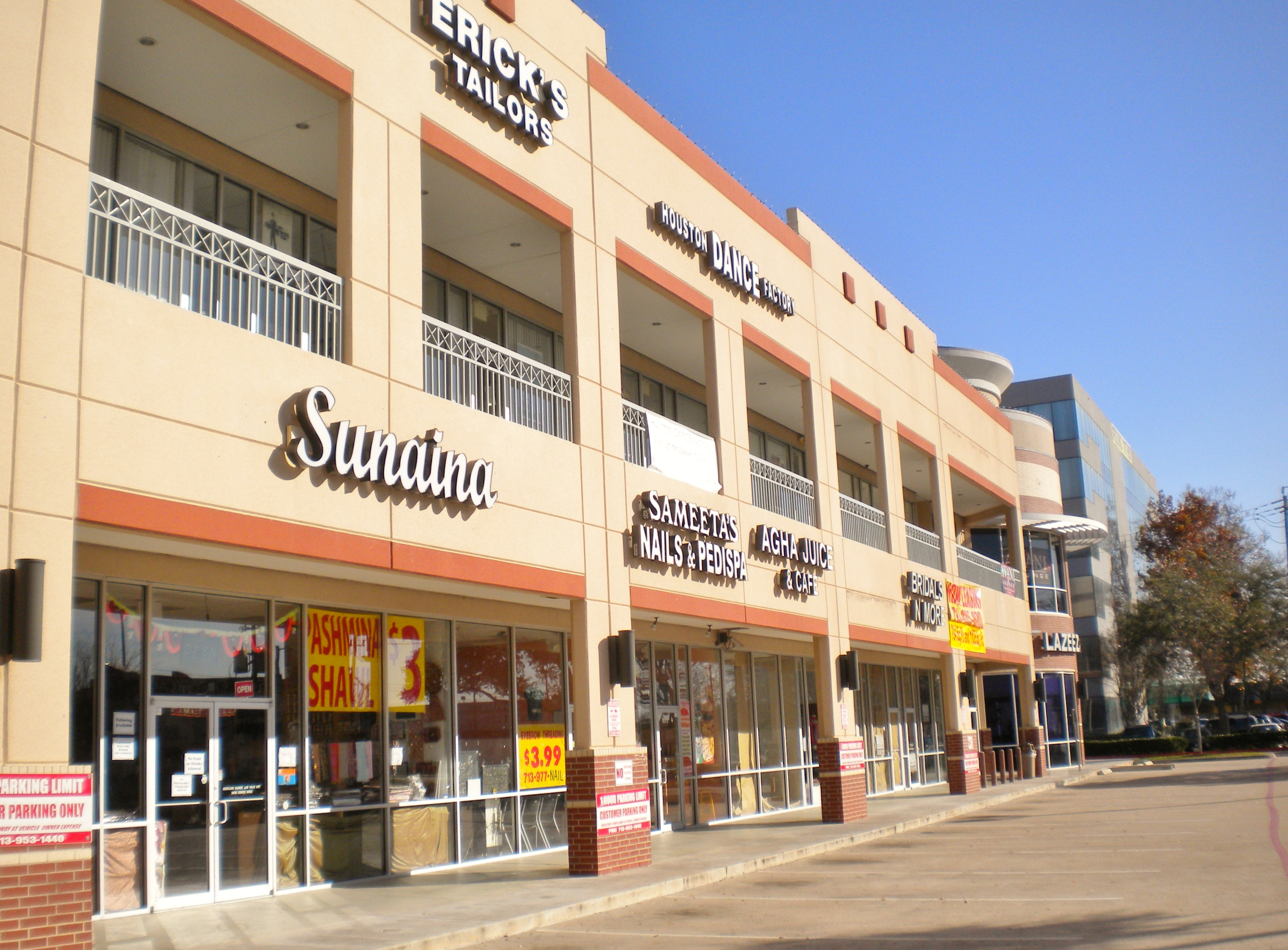
The Plaza @ Hillcroft & Hawrin5711 Hillcroft St.

== See also ==
- Asian Americans in Houston
- History of the Pakistani Americans in Houston
