= Gokulpuri metro station =

Metro station in Delhi, India

Gokulpuri

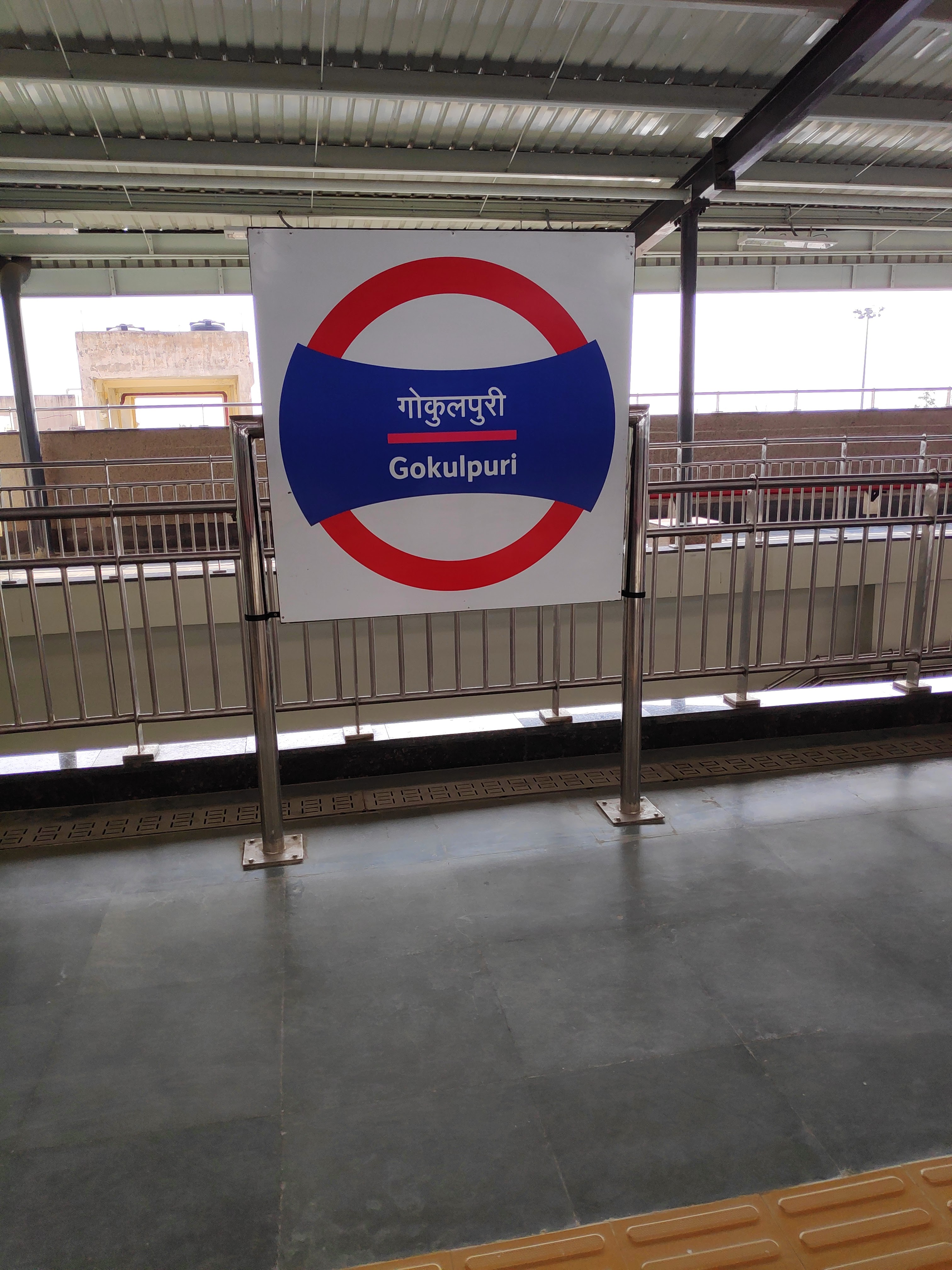

General information
- Location: Sanjay Colony, Gokalpur, Gokalpuri, Delhi, 110094
- Coordinates: 28°42′09″N 77°17′10″E
- System: Delhi Metro station
- Owner: Delhi Metro
- Line: Pink Line
- Platforms: Side Platform; Platform 1 → Shiv Vihar; Platform 2 → Maujpur - Babarpur
- Tracks: 2

Construction
- Structure type: Elevated
- Platform levels: 2
- Parking: No
- Cycle facilities: No
- Accessible: Yes

Other information
- Station code: GKPR

History
- Opened: 3 October 2018; 8 years ago
- Electrified: 25 kV 50 Hz AC through overhead catenary

Services
Preceding station	Delhi Metro	Following station
Maujpur - Babarpur Terminus	Pink Line	Johri Enclave towards Shiv Vihar
Route map
Location

Gokulpuri is an elevated metro station on the Pink Line of the Delhi Metro, located in northeast Delhi. It was opened to the public on 31 October 2018 as part of Phase III of the Delhi Metro. The station lies on the Maujpur-Babarpur–Shiv Vihar branch of the Pink Line, which connects with the circular corridor at Maujpur-Babarpur.

== Accident ==
On 8 February 2024, a portion of the eastern-side boundary wall of Gokulpuri metro station collapsed onto the road below, killing one person and injuring four others. The deceased was identified as 53-year-old Vinod Kumar Pandey, a resident of Karawal Nagar. Following the incident, the Delhi Metro Rail Corporation (DMRC) suspended a manager and a junior engineer from its civil department pending an inquiry and ordered safety inspections of elevated stations on the Pink Line.

As part of the subsequent safety measures, DMRC inspected the parapets and other structural components of elevated stations on the Pink Line. In July 2024, the corporation replaced the concrete side walls with stainless-steel railings at five stations: Gokulpuri, Jafrabad, Welcome, East Azad Nagar and Krishna Nagar. It also installed rainwater drainage pipes and saucer drains at these stations to improve water drainage and prevent leakage-related damage.

== Station layout ==
L2	Side platform | Doors will open on the left
L2	Platform 1 Northeast Bound	Towards → Shiv Vihar; Next Station: Johri Enclave
L2	Platform 2 Northwest Bound	Towards ← Maujpur - Babarpur; Terminus / Change at the next station for Pink Line Circular
L2	Side platform | Doors will open on the left
L1	Concourse	Fare control, station agent, Metro Card vending machines, crossover
G	Street level	Exit/Entrance

== See also ==
- List of Delhi Metro stations
- Transport in Delhi
- Delhi Metro Rail Corporation
- Delhi Suburban Railway
