= KHNA =

KHNA may refer to:

- KHNA-LP, a low-power radio station (94.3 FM) licensed to serve Sheridan, Wyoming, United States
- KKAR, a radio station (104.9 FM) licensed to serve Wamsutter, Wyoming, which held the call sign KHNA from 2009 to 2013
- Krishna Nagar metro station (Delhi) (Delhi Metro station code), a metro station in Delhi, India
