= Karkarduma Court metro station =

Metro station in Delhi, India

Karkarduma Court

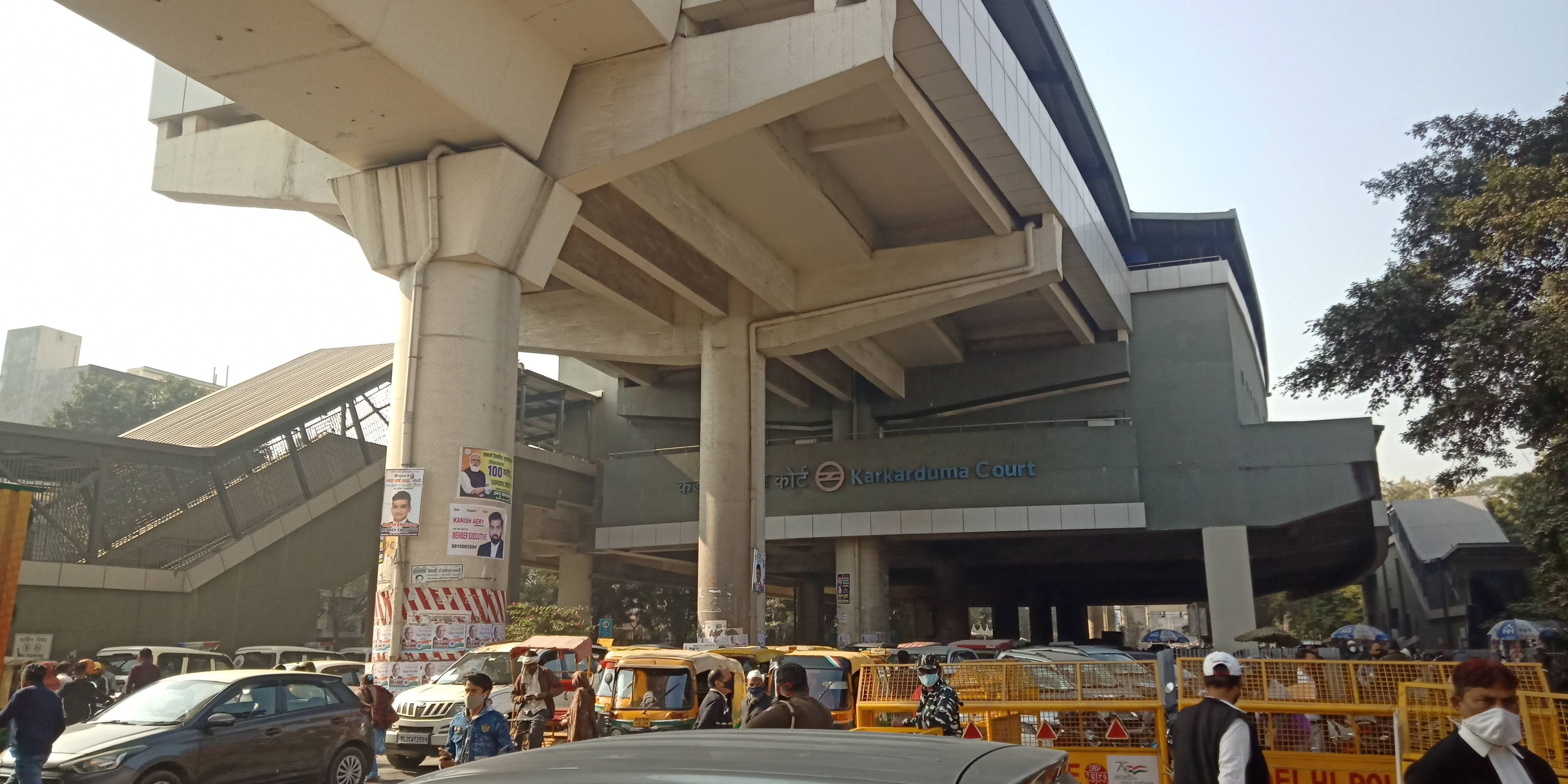

General information
- Location: Arjun Gali, A G C R Enclave, Karkarduma Court, Karkarduma, Delhi, 110092
- Coordinates: 28°39′13″N 77°17′45″E
- System: Delhi Metro station
- Owner: Delhi Metro
- Operator: Delhi Metro Rail Corporation (DMRC)
- Line: Pink Line
- Platforms: Side Platform; Platform 1 → "-" Circular Line; Platform 2 → "+" Circular Line
- Tracks: 2

Construction
- Structure type: Elevated
- Platform levels: 2
- Accessible: Yes

Other information
- Station code: KKDC

History
- Opened: 31 October 2018; 7 years ago
- Electrified: 25 kV 50 Hz AC through overhead catenary

Services
| Preceding station | Delhi Metro | Following station |
|---|---|---|
| Karkarduma towards Maujpur - Babarpur | Pink Line | Krishna Nagar towards Maujpur - Babarpur |
Route map
Location

The Karkarduma Court metro station is located on the Pink Line of the Delhi Metro.

As part of Phase III of Delhi Metro, Karkarduma Court is the metro station of the Pink Line.

== Station layout ==
| L2 | Side platform | Doors will open on the left |
| L2 | Platform 1 Anticlockwise | "-" Circular Line (Anticlockwise); Via: Krishna Nagar, East Azad Nagar, Welcome, Jaffrabad, Maujpur - Babarpur, Yamuna Vihar, Bhajanpura, Khajuri Khas, Nanaksar - Sonia Vihar, Jagatpur - Wazirabad, Burari, Majlis Park, Azadpur, Shalimar Bagh, Netaji Subhash Place, Punjabi Bagh West, Rajouri Garden, Mayapuri, Naraina Vihar; Next Station: Krishna Nagar |
| L2 | Platform 2 Clockwise | "+" Circular Line (Clockwise); Via: Karkarduma, Anand Vihar, IP Extension, Trilokpuri - Sanjay Lake, Shree Ram Mandir Mayur Vihar, Mayur Vihar-I, Sarai Kale Khan - Nizamuddin, Lajpat Nagar, South Extension, Dilli Haat - INA, Sarojini Nagar, Sir M. Vishweshwaraiah Moti Bagh, Durgabai Deshmukh South Campus, Delhi Cantt. Next Station: Karkarduma; Change at the next station for Blue Line |
| L2 | Side platform | Doors will open on the left |
| L1 | Concourse | Fare control, station agent, Metro Card vending machines, crossover |
| G | Street level | Exit/Entrance |

== See also ==
- List of Delhi Metro stations
- Transport in Delhi
- Delhi Metro Rail Corporation
- Delhi Suburban Railway
