= Johri Enclave metro station =

Metro station in Uttar Pradesh, India

Johri Enclave

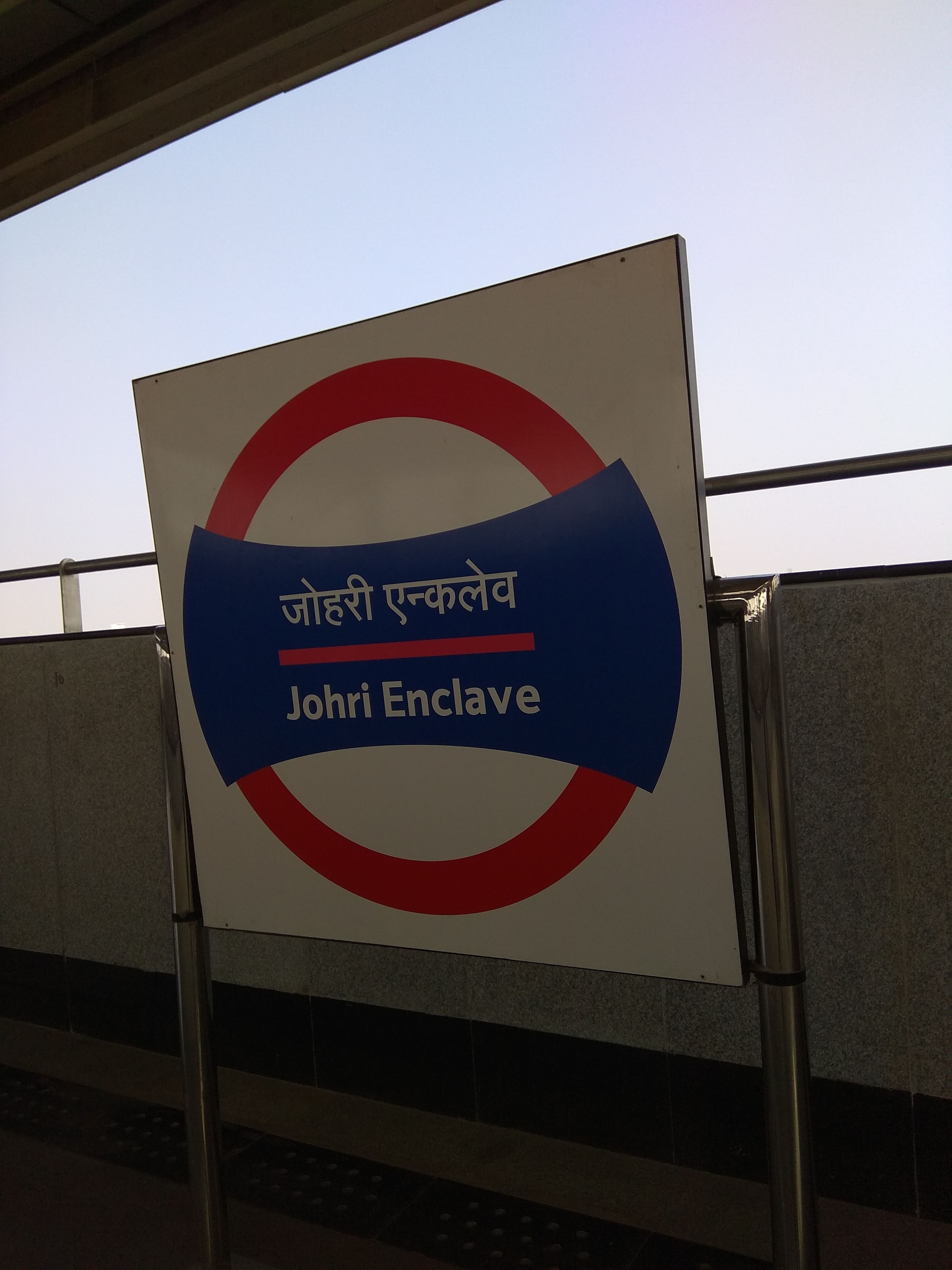

General information
- Location: Johri Enclave, Gulab Vatika, Jawahar Nagar, Ghaziabad, Uttar Pradesh 201102
- Coordinates: 28°42′47″N 77°17′24″E
- System: Delhi Metro station
- Owner: Delhi Metro
- Line: Pink Line
- Platforms: Side Platform; Platform 1 → Shiv Vihar; Platform 2 → Maujpur - Babarpur
- Tracks: 2

Construction
- Structure type: Elevated
- Platform levels: 2
- Accessible: Yes

Other information
- Station code: JIEE

History
- Opened: 31 October 2018; 8 years ago
- Electrified: 25 kV 50 Hz AC through overhead catenary

Services
Preceding station	Delhi Metro	Following station
Gokulpuri towards Maujpur - Babarpur	Pink Line	Shiv Vihar Terminus
Route map
Location

Johri Enclave is an elevated metro station on the Pink Line of the Delhi Metro, located in Jawahar Nagar near Gulab Vatika in Ghaziabad, Uttar Pradesh. It was opened to the public on 31 October 2018 as part of the 17.86-km Shiv Vihar–Trilokpuri Sanjay Lake section of Phase III.

The station lies on the Maujpur-Babarpur–Shiv Vihar branch of the Pink Line, which connects to the circular corridor at Maujpur-Babarpur. The branch continues beyond Johri Enclave through Shiv Vihar, its terminal station.

== Station layout ==
L2	Side platform | Doors will open on the left
L2	Platform 1 Northeast Bound	Towards → Shiv Vihar; Terminus
L2	Platform 2 Northwest Bound	Towards ← Maujpur - Babarpur; Next Station: Gokulpuri
L2	Side platform | Doors will open on the left
L1	Concourse	Fare control, station agent, Metro Card vending machines, crossover
G	Street level	Exit/Entrance

== See also ==
- List of Delhi Metro stations
- Transport in Delhi
- Delhi Metro Rail Corporation
- Delhi Suburban Railway
