= East Azad Nagar metro station =

Metro station in Delhi, India

East Azad Nagar

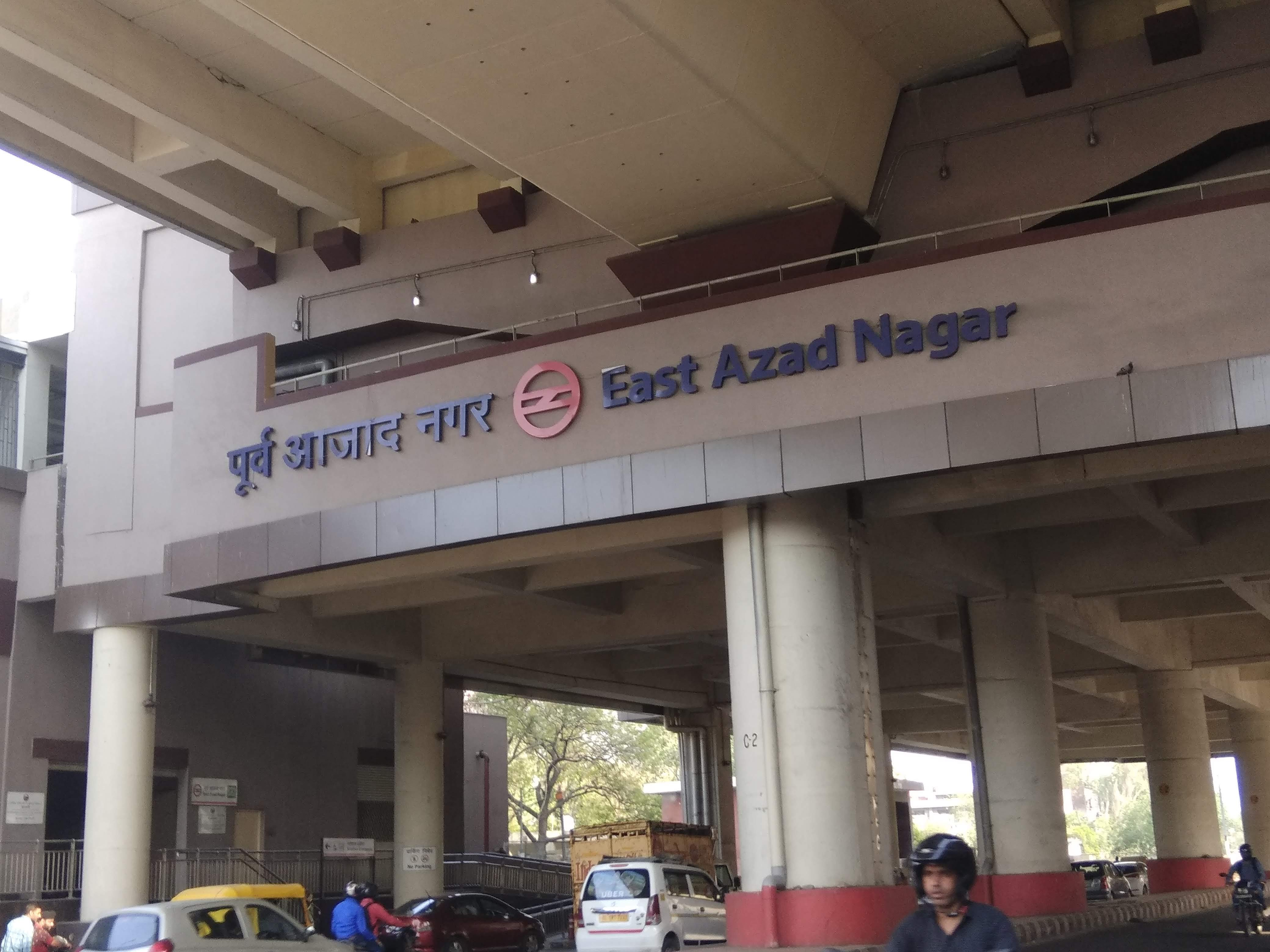

General information
- Location: East Old Seelampur, Shahdara, East Azad Nagar, Delhi, 110051
- Coordinates: 28°39′53″N 77°17′06″E
- System: Delhi Metro station
- Owner: Delhi Metro
- Operator: Delhi Metro Rail Corporation (DMRC)
- Line: Pink Line
- Platforms: Side Platform; Platform 1 → "-" Circular Line; Platform 2 → "+" Circular Line
- Tracks: 2

Construction
- Structure type: Elevated
- Platform levels: 2
- Accessible: Yes

Other information
- Station code: EANR

History
- Opened: 31 October 2018
- Electrified: 25 kV 50 Hz AC through overhead catenary

Services
Preceding station	Delhi Metro	Following station
Krishna Nagar towards Maujpur - Babarpur	Pink Line	Welcome towards Maujpur - Babarpur
Route map
Location

The East Azad Nagar metro station opened on 31 October 2018 and is located on the Pink Line of the Delhi Metro.

== Station layout ==
L2	Side platform | Doors will open on the left
L2	Platform 1 Anticlockwise	"-" Circular Line (Anticlockwise); Via: Welcome, Jaffrabad, Maujpur - Babarpur, Yamuna Vihar, Bhajanpura, Khajuri Khas, Nanaksar - Sonia Vihar, Jagatpur - Wazirabad, Burari, Majlis Park, Azadpur, Shalimar Bagh, Netaji Subhash Place, Punjabi Bagh West, Rajouri Garden, Mayapuri, Naraina Vihar, Delhi Cantt. Next Station: Welcome; Change at the next station for Red Line
L2	Platform 2 Clockwise	"+" Circular Line (Clockwise); Via: Krishna Nagar, Karkarduma Court, Karkarduma, Anand Vihar, IP Extension, Trilokpuri - Sanjay Lake, Shree Ram Mandir Mayur Vihar, Mayur Vihar-I, Sarai Kale Khan - Nizamuddin, Lajpat Nagar, South Extension, Dilli Haat - INA, Sarojini Nagar, Sir M. Vishweshwaraiah Moti Bagh, Durgabai Deshmukh South Campus; Next Station: Krishna Nagar
L2	Side platform | Doors will open on the left
L1	Concourse	Fare control, station agent, Metro Card vending machines, crossover
G	Street level	Exit/Entrance

== See also ==
- List of Delhi Metro stations
- Transport in Delhi
- Delhi Metro Rail Corporation
- Delhi Suburban Railway
