= Krishna Nagar metro station (Delhi) =

Metro station in Delhi, India

Krishna Nagar

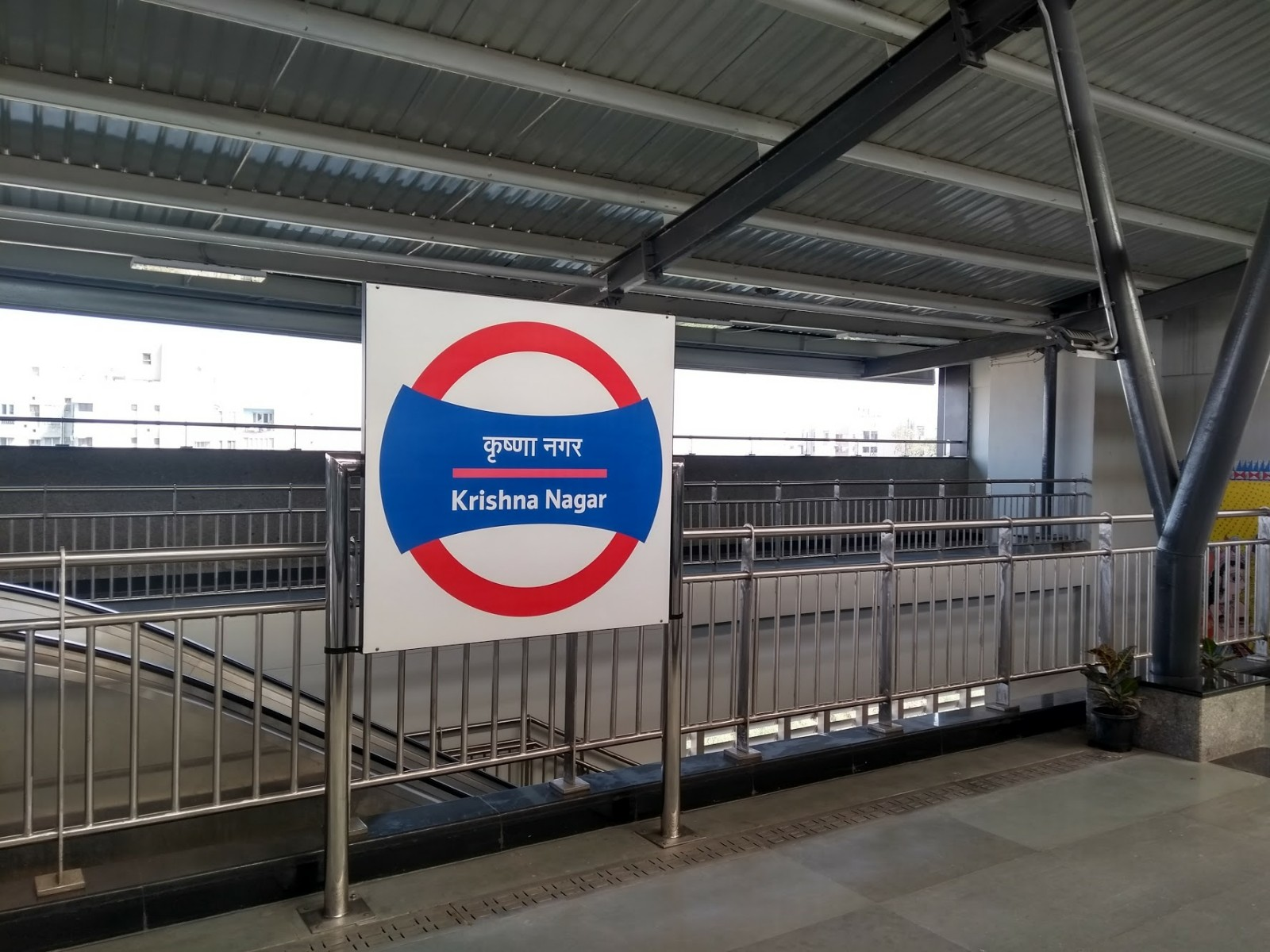

General information
- Location: Krishna Nagar, Vishwas Nagar Extension, Vishwas Nagar, Delhi, 110051
- Coordinates: 28°39′28″N 77°17′25″E
- System: Delhi Metro station
- Owner: Delhi Metro
- Operator: Delhi Metro Rail Corporation (DMRC)
- Line: Pink Line
- Platforms: Side Platform; Platform 1 → "-" Circular Line; Platform 2 → "+" Circular Line
- Tracks: 2

Construction
- Structure type: Elevated
- Platform levels: 2
- Accessible: Yes

Other information
- Station code: KHNA

History
- Opened: 31 October 2018; 7 years ago
- Electrified: 25 kV 50 Hz AC through overhead catenary

Services
Preceding station	Delhi Metro	Following station
Karkarduma Court towards Maujpur - Babarpur	Pink Line	East Azad Nagar towards Maujpur - Babarpur
Route map
Location

The Krishna Nagar metro station is located on the Pink Line of the Delhi Metro.

As part of Phase III of Delhi Metro, Krishna Nagar is the metro station of the Pink Line.

== Station layout ==
L2	Side platform | Doors will open on the left
L2	Platform 1 Anticlockwise	"-" Circular Line (Anticlockwise); Via: East Azad Nagar, Welcome, Jaffrabad, Maujpur - Babarpur, Yamuna Vihar, Bhajanpura, Khajuri Khas, Nanaksar - Sonia Vihar, Jagatpur - Wazirabad, Burari, Majlis Park, Azadpur, Shalimar Bagh, Netaji Subhash Place, Punjabi Bagh West, Rajouri Garden, Mayapuri, Naraina Vihar, Delhi Cantt. Next Station: East Azad Nagar
L2	Platform 2 Clockwise	"+" Circular Line (Clockwise); Via: Karkarduma Court, Karkarduma, Anand Vihar, IP Extension, Trilokpuri - Sanjay Lake, Shree Ram Mandir Mayur Vihar, Mayur Vihar-I, Sarai Kale Khan - Nizamuddin, Lajpat Nagar, South Extension, Dilli Haat - INA, Sarojini Nagar, Sir M. Vishweshwaraiah Moti Bagh, Durgabai Deshmukh South Campus; Next Station: Karkarduma Court
L2	Side platform | Doors will open on the left
L1	Concourse	Fare control, station agent, Metro Card vending machines, crossover
G	Street level	Exit/Entrance

== See also ==
- List of Delhi Metro stations
- Transport in Delhi
- Delhi Metro Rail Corporation
- Delhi Suburban Railway
