= Raj Bisaria =

Indian director, actor, producer and educationist (1935–2024)

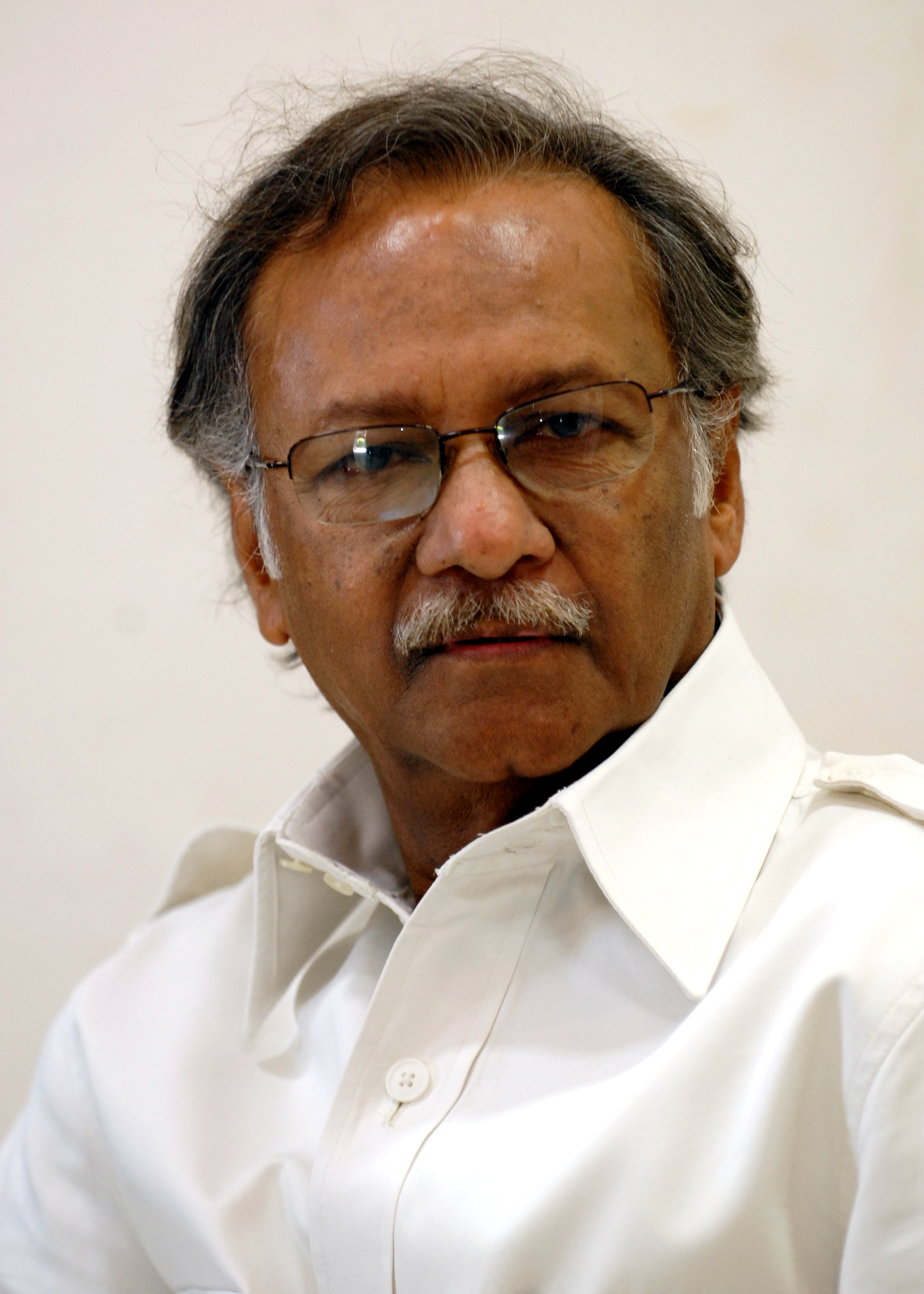
- Born: 10 November 1935; Lakhimpur, United Provinces of Agra and Oudh, British India
- Died: 16 February 2024 (aged 88); Vishal Khand, Gomti Nagar, Lucknow, Uttar Pradesh, India
- Other name: Raju
- Occupations: Theatre director, actor, producer and educationist
- Notable work: Founder of the Theatre Arts Workshop (TAW) and Bhartendu Academy of Dramatic Arts
- Spouse: Kiran Raj Bisaria
- Website: www.rajbisaria.com

Raj Bisaria (10 November 1935 – 16 February 2024) was an Indian director, producer, actor and educationalist, described by the Press Trust of India as "the father of the modern theatre in North India". He founded Theatre Arts Workshop in 1966, and Bhartendu Academy of Dramatic Arts in 1975 and the repertory company of Bhartendu Academy of Dramatic Arts in 1980. He blended artistic concepts of the East and the West, and the traditional and the modern. He was nurtured and supported by Senior Member in the University Executive Council Nirmal Chandra Chaturvedi, MLC.

== Background ==
Raj Bisaria was born in Lakhimpur Kheri, United Provinces of British India (now in Uttar Pradesh), on 10 November 1935, the son of the late P.L. Bisaria and Leelavati Singh. He was educated at Colvin Taluqdars' College and Lucknow University, Lucknow, and retired as a senior professor of English Literature from Lucknow University. In 1969, Bisaria married the Kiran Kuchawan; the couple have a daughter, Rajina.

The initiative was taken by his University Theatre Group formed in 1962. Four years later, Raj Bisaria founded the Theatre Arts Workshop (TAW) in 1966 and Bhartendu Academy of Dramatic Arts, Government of Uttar Pradesh, in 1975, and the repertory company of BNA in 1981. He was the first man from Uttar Pradesh to have been awarded a Padma Shree for work in modern theatre and his contribution towards the growth of theatre in India.

Bisaria tried to infuse a new sense of consciousness with regard to the dramatic and performing arts and aesthetic awareness of the performing arts in northern India.

Bisaria was removed as the honorary director of Bhartendu Academy of Dramatic Arts, and he was assaulted twice, first in 1988 and then in 1995.

Raj Bisaria died after a battle with throat cancer on 16 February 2024, at the age of 88.

=== Theatre training ===
External theatre training for Raj Bisaria included an invitation by the British Council, London, to visit the UK and train at the British Drama League (now the British Theatre Association) as a producer, drama instructor, and adjudicator, in 1969.

== Director and designer ==
Raj Bisaria was also a stage director with a grounding in both the western classics and contemporary dramatic works.

Raj Bisaria tried to ensure that the dramatic and performing arts conform to a professional discipline and communicate through a new aesthetic medium. His plays are concerned with men-women relationships and social issues of special concern to him. Through the productions of European and Indian plays from 1966 onwards, Bisaria presented a wide spectrum of contemporary world drama as director and designer.

Largely using his own devices and creative expression he began his work in English and then to use Hindustani as the spoken medium of expression from 1973. He encouraged folk theatre in the Uttar Pradesh local genre known as the Nautanki.

In 1972, he took a major shift in his emphasis from modern Euro-American productions to plays in Hindi of modern Indian playwrights: Mohan Rakesh, Badal Sircar, Adya Rangacharya, Dharamvir Bharti, Shesh and Mohit Chatterjee.

Over the years, Raj Bisaria produced and directed over 75 theatre productions. In addition he supervised, produced/directed a large number of productions in the Bhartendu Academy of Dramatic Arts from 1975 to 1986 and later on; and also in National School of Drama and for its Repertory Company.

His major productions have included Maxwell Anderson's Barefoot in Athens; Shakespeare's Julius Caesar, Macbeth, Othello, King Lear; George Bernard Shaw's Candida; Harold Pinter's The Caretaker; Sartre's In Camera; Ionesco's The Lesson; Strindberg's The Father, Jean Anouilh's Antigone; and various plays of Chekhov, Ionesco, Tennessee Williams, Shaffer and others. His major productions of Indian plays have included Dharamvir Bharati's Andha Yug, Badal Sircar's Baqi Itihas, Adya Rangacharya's Suno Janmejaya, Elkunchwar's Garbo, Mohan Rakesh's Aadhe-Adhure and Mohit Chatterjee's Guinea Pig.

== Criticism ==
Critics found Ann Jellicoe's The Knack revolting and Sartre's In Camera and Ionesco's The Lesson too demanding. The TAW team has a group of permanent actors, with other interested parties for different productions.

Lack of men and material compelled Raj Bisaria to stage Othello with only four characters. And yet it was a performance. The efforts of Raj Bisaria have yielded results.

== Actor ==
As an actor of stage, radio, television and films, Bisaria was known from 1978 as a major actor of the Doordarshan. As a theatre actor Raj Bisaria did significant roles in several of TAW's English and Hindi stage productions, films and television.

Bisaria played leading roles in at least two dozen plays in English and Hindi, such as:

- Sheridan's The School for Scandal
- Pirandello's Right You Are (if you think so)
- Shaw's Candida
- Coward's Nude with Violin
- Sartre's In Camera
- Shaffer's Black Comedy
- Tom Stoppard's The Real Inspector Hound
- Osborne's Look Back in Anger
- Orton's Loot
- Chatterjee's Guinea Pig
- Badal Sircar's Baqi Itihas
- Elkunchawar's Garbo
- Matkari's Akela Jeev Sadashiv
- Shakespeare's King Lear directed by Amal Allana
- Biwi Natiyon Wali
- Mai Wo Nahi directed by Sushil Kumar Singh
- Manno Bhandari's Apka Banti directed by Amal Allana
- Kamleshwar's Ret Pe Likhe Naam
- Badal Sircar's Pagla Ghoda directed by Rajan Sabbarwal
- Raj Se Swaraj directed by Amal Allana
- Muzzaffar Ali's Aagaman
- Govind Nilhani's Aaghat

== Impresario ==
As impresario Raj Bisaria's widening interests had led to the introduction of Irshad Panjatan's mime in 1967 and next year the presentation of the Murray Louis Dance Company of USA. This broadening activity and involvement with the performing arts also saw a classical dance performance by Sonal Mansingh, in 1970, the début of Om Shivpuri's Dishanter group in 1972, a painting exhibition of R.S. Bisht's miniature in 1973, Richard Schechners' environmental theatre presentation of Mother Courage and Her Children from New York in 1976, and the Annapolis Brass Quintet in 1981 - all arranged at the initiative of Raj Bisaria's TAW.

== Educationist ==
As a dramaturge his primary concern was an effort to resolve the problem of creative reinterpretation of the classical and theatrical art of his region to find itself in contemporary social relevance. He structured Theatre Training Programmes in U.P. through workshops and certificate and diploma courses in North India from 1966. He founded in 1975 for the Government of U.P. India's second school of drama: Bhartendu Natya Akademi-Bhartendu Academy of Dramatic Arts.

Raj Bisaria was interested as an actor, director and theatre teacher in the system of Konstantin Stanislavski and Bertolt Brecht. The Russian theatre practitioner provided the core of Raj Bisaria's directing and pedagogy in contemporary Indian theatre. Later, he developed his own system of holistic acting, which produced three generations of actors and directors.

=== Theatre Arts Workshop ===
In December 1963, ten members organized a theatre play and put through a programme – An Evening with Young Actors – which included Edna St. Vincent Millay's Aria da Capo, scenes from Twelfth Night and Macbeth, The Valiant and a dramatized reading of Hamlet, and a dramatisation of T. S. Eliot's poem "The Love Song of J. Alfred Prufrock." Raj Bisaria produced and directed all the play, and he decided to register a theatre group with a managing body, using local talent. The theatre group was bilingual (English and Hindi), and concerned itself with encouraging interest in theatre-craft and developing a greater awareness of theatre, an ability to appreciate drama, and a firmer grap of ideas and technique.

By the winter of 1965, his plans had been finalized. No financial help was forthcoming yet. Finally, he staked a large part of his personal fortune on the project, selected members for the committee, picked out a likely group of four English actors and of helpers, and established what has since then been called Theatre Arts Workshop – a theatre for enthusiasts in drama and allied arts.

Thus in 1966, Theatre Arts Workshop (TAW) was founded by Raj Bisaria, as a president and artistic director, with the aim of creating interest in dramatic arts among the young, and help them to develop an insight into acting, direction and allied arts. The name 'Theatre Arts Workshop' is unit for theatre and allied performing arts; its members are to be exposed to workshop methods of representation. TAW was to be a training organization and then a performing group, with its motto training before performance. Its philosophy is "your right is to work only, but never the fruit thereof. Let not the fruit of action be your object, nor let your attachment be to inaction." – Sri Krishna to sorrowing Arjuna (The Bhagvadgita, chapter II - 47)

==== English theatre ====
Raj Bisaria started his venture in English language with Shakespeare's Othello in 1966, Christopher Fry's poetic play A Phoenix too Frequent and Eugène Ionesco's absurd play The Lesson in 1967. The selection of these two plays; diametrically opposite in their form and content, in a single show was an experiment by Raj Bisaria. It was a box office failure.

In 1967 a significant advance was made when Raj Bisaria decided to produce and direct Jean-Paul Sartre's existential In Camera, Edna St. Vincent Millay's Aria Da Capo and Ronald Duncan's translation of 12th century classic Abelard and Heloise in a three-bill presentation, in November, 1967. These were crucial productions as TAW's audience wavered between shocked admiration and shocked disgust. Four hours of continuous drama was considereda bit too much.

==== Hindi and Urdu theatre ====
Raj Bisaria was aware from the very beginning that any worthwhile theatre activity had to find its moorings in Hindi and other Indian languages. He sought the co-operation of the then existing theatre groups to realize his plans to establish a bilingual theatre in Lucknow. But his effort failed to elicit any response from them. He even brought the production rights of Mohan Rakesh's well known play, Adhe-Adhure, which he could not stage for want of a suitable cast. In his bid to switch over to Hindi drama, he invited Delhi groups to produce, under TAW's auspices, plays in Hindi with a view to making local groups conscious of the potentialities and challenges of Hindi Theatre.

TAW's first Hindi play was Baqi Itihas, a translation of Badal Sircar's Bengali play on a thrust stage. It was a non-realistic presentation, using giant slides and specially designed music, the first production of the kind in the country.

Baqi Itihas was followed by a wide range of plays in translation from English, Bengali, Marathi, Kannada, in addition to those originally in Hindi; Andha Yug, Suno Janmejaya, Adhe-Adhure, The Cave Dwellers, Antigone, Garbo, Candida, Father, Sleuth, Barefoot in Athens, The Caretaker etc.

TAW is considered the protagonist of theatre art, from the classical to the experimental plays .

TAW mounted on stage the European and American playwrights; its repertoire including Shakespeare, Shaw, Sartre, Ionesco, Fry, Arthur Miller, Tennessee Williams, Noël Coward, Ronald Duncan, Rattigan, Harold Pinter, Ann Jellicoe, Peter Shaffer, Edward Albee, Jean Anouilh, Maxwell Anderson and Orton.

According to The Pioneer, The dynamism of TAW productions, their stylistic experimentation and directorial subtlety, were never in doubt on either side of the proscenium. But TAW's plays proved too radical in the context of existing provincial attitudes.

=== Bhartendu Academy of Dramatic Arts ===
As a theatre educator as early as 1973, Raj Bisaria suggested to the State Government that he should start a semi-professional repertory theatre in Uttar Pradesh, in 1974 the State Government went a few steps further and requested him to evolve a scheme for establishing a drama school, which would function as a full-fledged academy of dramatic arts.

Bhartendu Natya Akademi (BNA): Bhartendu Academy of Dramatic Arts (BADA), when it was founded in 1975 became the first of its kind in the large Hindi belt of Bihar, Uttar Pradesh, Madhya Pradesh and Rajasthan. The only other being the Delhi-based National School of Drama. From 1975 to 1986, in an honorary capacity, he had the responsibility of teaching acting and direction (aspects both theoretical and practical) western drama, from the Greeks to modern times; theatre criticism and adjudication and aesthetics of light, and set design. He worked again as, director of the academy as well as the director of its Repertory Company from 1989 to 1992, 1995 to 1997.

As theatre administrator with minimal facilities, poor funds and negligible infrastructure, he developed and consolidated the viability and status of a school of theatre beginning initially as an elementary agency for dissemination of theatrical know-how in 1976 to a professional academy of dramatic arts in 1981.

== Fellowship projects ==
'The Mind of the Director'- A book on Hindi theatre directors, under the 'Senior Fellowship' of Government of India.

'Shakespeare's Indian Summer' - A theatrical study of Shakespearean plays in India, under the highest cultural fellowship of India - 'Tagore National Fellowship' (2013–14).

== Major productions as director ==
- February 1966 Othello in English – William Shakespeare, (TAW)
- May 1967 A Phoenix too Frequent in English – Christopher Fry, (TAW)
- May 1967 The Lesson in English – Eugène Ionesco, (TAW)
- November 1967 In Camera in English – Jean-Paul Sartre, (TAW)
- November 1967 Aria Da Capo in English – Edna St. Vincent Millay, (TAW)
- November 1967 Abelard and Heloise in English – Ronald Duncan, (TAW)
- March 1968 The Knack in English – Ann Jellicoe, (TAW)
- October 1968 Hello Out There in English – William Saroyan, (TAW)
- October 1968 The Zoo Story in English – Edward Albee, (TAW)
- October 1968 The White Liars in English – Peter Shaffer, (TAW)
- May 1971 Black Comedy in English Peter Shaffer, (TAW)
- September 1972 Say Who You Are in English Keith Waterhouse and Willis Hall, (TAW)
- February 1974 Loot in English Joe Orton, (TAW)
- May 1973 Baki Itihas in Hindi Badal Sircar, (TAW)
- June 1973 Guinea Pig in Hindi Mohit Chatterji, (TAW) directed by Manohar Singh
- 1973 Andhon Ka Hathi in Hindi Sharad Joshi, (TAW)
- July 1974 Suno Janmejaya in Hindi Adya Rangacharya, (TAW)
- January 1975 Akela Jeev Sadashiv in Hindi Ratnaker Matkari, (TAW)
- June 1977 Antigone in Urdu Jean Anouilh, (TAW)
- 1979 Gufavasi – The Cave Dwellers in Hindi William Saroyan, (TAW)
- 1979 Andha Yug in Hindi Dharamvir Bharati, (Bhartendu Academy of Dramatic Arts)
- August 1981, 1983 Aadhe-Adhure in Hindi Mohan Rakesh, (TAW)
- February 1983 The Royal Hunt of the Sun in Hindi Peter Shaffer, (TAW)
- August 1983 Garbo in Hindi Mahesh Elkunchawar, (TAW)
- August 1984 Suniti – Candida in Hindi George Bernard Shaw, (TAW)
- 1984 Bahut Bada Sawal in Hindi Mohan Rakesh, (Bhartendu Academy of Dramatic Arts)
- 1984 Baki Itihas in Hindi Badal Sircar, (Bhartendu Academy of Dramatic Arts)
- December 1989 – 1990 Julius Caesar in Hindi William Shakespeare, (Bhartendu Academy of Dramatic Arts)
- April 1995 Hot Air in Hindi Ferenc Karinthy, (TAW)
- April 1995 The Dumb Waiter in Hindi Harold Pinter, (TAW)
- 1990 and 2000 Raaz – Sleuth in Hindi Anthony Shaffer, (TAW)
- 1989 and 2000 Pita – Father in Hindi August Strindberg, (TAW)
- April 2007 Candida in Hindi George Bernard Shaw, (National School of Drama)
- May 2008 Macbeth in Hindi, William Shakespeare,(Bhartendu Academy of Dramatic Arts)
- December 2008 Othello in Urdu, William Shakespeare, (National School of Drama Repertory Company)
- May 2010 King Lear in Hindi, William Shakespeare, (Bhartendu Academy of Dramatic Arts)
- February 2011 Landscape and Silence in English Harold Pinter,(TAW)
- February 2011 Mountain Language in Hindi Harold Pinter,(TAW)
- February 2012 The White Liars in Hindi Peter Shaffer,(TAW)
- March 2012 Antigone in Urdu Jean Anouilh, (TAW)
- February 2013 Barefoot in Athens in Hindi Maxwell Anderson, (TAW),
- May 2013 The Seagull in Hindi Anton Chekhov,(Bhartendu Academy of Dramatic Arts)
- August 2014 The Caretaker in Hindi Harold Pinter, (TAW)
- May 2015 Julius Caesar in Hindi, William Shakespeare, National School of Drama
- March 2016 Raaz Sleuth, in Hindi Anthony Shaffer, (TAW)

== Honours ==
- Sangeet Natak Akademi, Uttar Pradesh Award, for Direction – 1988. He declined the award.
- Padma Shree – 1990, for contribution to Modern Indian Theatre, by the Government of India the first theatre person from Uttar Pradesh to be so honoured.
- Yash Bharti – 1994 – Lifetime achievement award 1994 by the Government of Uttar Pradesh.
- U.P. Ratna – 1996 – by All India Conference of Intellectuals for Theatre Direction and Contribution to Media.
- Distinguished Service Honour – NGO Helpage India – 1997.
- Fun-Vibhushan, NGO, Bhartiya Funkar Society, U.P. – 1998.
- Bhartendu Academy of Dramatic Arts – Recognition for his unique services and contribution as its founder-director – 2000.
- Central Sangeet Natak Akademi Award for Direction- 2004.
- National School of Drama Recognition for composite contribution to Theatre in India.
- Aditya Vikram Birla Kalashikhar Puraskar – Life Time Achievement Award – 2010
- The Chaman Lal Memorial Award – for Life-Long Achievement to Theatre World – 2012
- Tagore National Fellowship (Highest Cultural Research Award of India) – for 'Shakespeare's Indian Summer' – A theatrical study of Shakespearean plays in India (2013–2014)
- The Madhya Pradesh government honouring him with its prestigious Kalidas Samman national award for 2015–2016 for achievement in theatre. The ceremony was held on 10 November in Ujjain, which was also the birthday of the then 80-year-old.
- Life Time Achievement Award by Doordarshan DD Uttar Pradesh, 2017
