= Theatre Arts Workshop =

Indian theatre organization

- Established: 1966
- Type: Theatre Organization
- Website: taw.org.in

The Theatre Arts Workshop (TAW) is a non-profit making, registered cultural organization established in 1966, in Lucknow, India.

As well as the plays of William Shakespeare and his contemporaries, TAW produces new work from living artists and develops creative links with theatre-makers.

TAW will celebrate its 50 anniversary in March 2016.

== Foundation and history ==
In December 1963, ten members organized a theatre play and put through a programme – An Evening with Young Actors – which included Edna St. Vincent Millay's Aria da Capo, scenes from Twelfth Night and Macbeth, The Valiant and a dramatized reading of Hamlet, Eliot, The Love Song of J. Alfred Prufrock. Raj Bisaria produced and directed all the plays, and decided to register a theatre group with a managing body and using local talent. A bilingual group theatre (English and Hindi), the central concern the development of a genuine interest in theatre-craft and creating within its scope, a theatre-consciousness, an ability to appreciate the drama of ideas and technique.

Bisaria financed the project, selected members for the committee, picked out a group of four English actors and helpers, and established what has since then been called Theatre Arts Workshop.

Thus in 1966, Theatre Arts Workshop (TAW) was founded by Raj Bisaria, as a president and artistic director, with the aim of creating interest in dramatic arts among the young, and help them to develop an insight into acting, direction and allied arts. The name ‘Theatre Arts Workshop’ is for theatre and allied performing arts; its members are to be exposed to workshop methods of representation. TAW was to be a training organization and then a performing group, with its motto ‘training before performance’. Its philosophy is "your right is to work only, but never the fruit thereof. Let not the fruit of action be your object, nor let your attachment be to inaction." – Sri Krishna to sorrowing Arjuna (The Bhagvadgita, chapter II - 47)

A token grant has been given by the Government of India – sufficient to meet the expenditure for one production.

== Theatre ==
William Shakespeare's Othello was the first play performed by the group, on 12 February 1966. It was adapted to be played by four actors, all British, and directed by Raj Bisaria, in the English language.

TAW has mounted over eighty major theatre productions till now. They have included performances both in English and Hindustani, and have included a range of plays from the US and England, major European plays and Indian plays drawn from various regional languages and Hindi. The productions have been interspersed with workshops, talks, arts shows and exchange programmes.

TAW mounted on stage the plays by European, American and Indian playwrights; its repertory including a selection from William Shakespeare, G.B. Shaw, Sartre, Ionesco, Christopher Fry, Arthur Miller, Tennessee Williams, Noël Coward, Ronald Duncan, Rattigan, Harold Pinter, Peter Shaffer, Jean Anouilh, Maxwell Anderson, Mohan Rakesh, Badal Sircar, Adya Rangacharya, Dharamvir Bharati, Shesh and Mohit Chatterjee and productions of Ann Jellicoe, Edward Albee and Orton, which proved too radical in the context of existing provincial attitudes which TAW is trying to change.

=== English theatre ===
The TAW started its venture in English language with Shakespeare's Othello in 1966, Christopher Fry's poetic play A Phoenix too Frequent and Eugène Ionesco’s absurdist play The Lesson in 1967.

In 1967 Raj Bisaria decided to produce and direct Jean-Paul Sartre's existentialist In Camera, Edna St. Vincent Millay’s Aria Da Capo and Ronald Duncan’s translation of 12th century classic Abelard and Heloise in a three-bill presentation, in November, 1967. These were crucial productions as TAW’s audience wavered between shocked admiration and shocked disgust.

=== Hindi and Urdu theatre ===
Raj Bisaria invited Delhi groups to produce, under TAW’s auspices, plays in Hindi with a view to making local groups conscious of the potentialities and challenges of Hindi theatre.

TAW’s first Hindi play was Baqi Itihas, a translation of Badal Sircar’s Bengali play on a thrust stage. It was a non-realistic presentation, using giant slides and specially designed music, the first production of the kind in the country.

Baqi Itihas was followed by a wide range of plays in translation from English, Bengali, Marathi, Kannada, in addition to those originally in Hindi; Andha Yug, Suno Janmejaya, Aadhe-Adhure, The Cave Dwellers, Antigone, Garbo, Candida, The Father, Sleuth, Barefoot in Athens The Caretaker, The Public Eye etc.

== Arts ==
Apart from the theatre TAW also introduced other allied performing arts for the very first time, like Irshad Panjatan’s Indian mime in 1967, and modern dance by America’s Murray Louise Dance Company in 1968, Indian classical dance by Sonal Mansingh in 1970, Om Shivpuri’s Hindi theatre group Dishanter in 1973, Richard Schechners’ environmental theatre presentation of Mother Courage and Her Children from New York in 1976, and painting exhibition of R.S. Bisht's miniatures in 1973 and the Annapolis Brass Quintet in 1981.

=== Workshop ===
With its motto training before performance, TAW has been conducting comprehensive theatre workshops since 1966, for young theatre aspirants. Its training primarily focuses on psychological and realistic acting, with special attention on voice and body. As of 2015 over 100 acting and theatre workshops have been organised by TAW.

== Major productions ==
- Feb 1966 Othello, in English, directed by Raj Bisaria - William Shakespeare
- May 1967 A Phoenix too Frequent, in English, directed by Raj Bisaria - Christopher Fry
- May 1967 The Lesson in English, - Eugène Ionesco, directed by Raj Bisaria
- Nov 1967 In Camera in English, - Jean-Paul Sartre, directed by Raj Bisaria
- Nov 1967 Aria Da Capo in English, - Edna St. Vincent Millay, directed by Raj Bisaria
- Nov 1967 Abelard and Heloise in English, - Ronald Duncan, directed by Raj Bisaria
- Mar 1968 The Knack in English, - Ann Jellicoe, directed by Raj Bisaria
- Oct 1968 Hello Out There! in English, directed by Raj Bisaria - William Saroyan
- Oct 1968 The Zoo Story in English, - Edward Albee, directed by Raj Bisaria
- Oct 1968 The White Liars in English, - Peter Shaffer, directed by Raj Bisaria
- Dec 1968 Nude with Violin in English, directed by Usha Panje - Noël Coward
- May 1969 The Glass Menagerie in English, directed by Hari Pillai] - Tennessee Williams
- Aug 1969 Harlequinade in English, Terence Rattigan, directed by Usha Panje
- Aug 1969 The Triumph of the Egg in English, Sherwood Anderson, directed by Usha Panje
- April 1970 The Real Inspector Hound in English, directed by Usha Panje
- May 1971 Black Comedy in English, Peter Shaffer, directed by Raj Bisaria
- Sep 1972 Say Who You Are in English, Keith Waterhouse and Willis Hall, directed by Raj Bisaria
- Feb 1974 Loot in English, Joe Orton, directed by Raj Bisaria
- May 1973 Baki Itihas in Hindi, Badal Sircar, directed by Raj Bisaria
- Jun 1973 Guinea Pig in Hindi, Mohit Chatterji directed by Manohar Singh
- 1973 Shayad, Hunh, Bahut Bada Sawal in Hindi, Mohan Rakesh, directed by Ram Gopal Bajaj
- 1973 Andhon Ka Hathi in Hindi, Sharad Joshi, directed by Raj Bisaria
- Jul 1974 Suno Janmejaya in Hindi, Adya Rangacharya, directed by Raj Bisaria
- Jan 1975 Akela Jeev Sadashiv in Hindi, Ratnaker Matkari, directed by Raj Bisaria
- Jun 1977 Antigone in Urdu, Jean Anouilh, directed by Raj Bisaria
- April 1978 Virodh in Hindi, Abhmanyu Anat Shabham, directed by Jeet Jardhari
- 1979 Gufavasi-The Cave Dwellers in Hindi, William Saroyan, directed by Raj Bisaria
- August 1981, 1983 Aadhe-Adhure in Hindi, Mohan Rakesh, directed by Raj Bisaria
- Feb 1983 The Royal Hunt of the Sun in Hindi, Peter Shaffer, directed by Raj Bisaria
- August 1983 Garbo in Hindi, Mahesh Elkunchawar, directed by Raj Bisaria
- Aug 1984 Suniti Candida in Hindi, George Bernard Shaw directed by Raj Bisaria
- May 1986 Accidental Death of an Anarchist in Hindi, Dario Fo, directed by Jugal Kishore
- August 1986 The Barber of Seville in Hindi, Pierre Beaumarchais, directed by Jugal Kishore
- November 1986 Bol Jamure Bol in Hindi, Puneet Asthana, directed by Jugal Kishore
- Apr 1995 Hot Air in Hindi, Ferenc Karinthy directed by Raj Bisaria
- Apr 1995 The Dumb Waiter in Hindi, Harold Pinter directed by Raj Bisaria
- 1990 and 2000 Raaz Sleuth in Hindi, Anthony Shaffer, directed by Raj Bisaria
- 1989 and 2000 Pita Father in Hindi, August Strindberg directed by Raj Bisaria
- Feb 2011 Landscape and Silence in English, Harold Pinter directed by Raj Bisaria
- Feb 2011 Mountain Language in Hindi, Harold Pinter directed by Raj Bisaria
- Feb 2012 The White Liars in Hindi, Peter Shaffer directed by Raj Bisaria
- Mar 2012 Antigone in Urdu - Jean Anouilh directed by Raj Bisaria
- Feb 2013 Barefoot in Athens in Hindi, Maxwell Anderson, directed by Raj Bisaria
- Aug 2014 The Caretaker in Hindi, Harold Pinter, directed by Raj Bisaria
- Dec 2014 The Public Eye in Urdu Peter Shaffer, directed by Ashish Tiwari
- March 2016 Raaz Sleuth, in Hindi Anthony Shaffer, directed by Raj Bisaria

== Notable actors in productions ==
- Anupam Kher
- Raj Bisaria
- Ram Gopal Bajaj
- Rajendra Gupta
- Surekha Sikri
- Surya Mohan Kulshreshtha
