= Pranjal Shrotriya =

Indian actor and theatre director (born 1966)

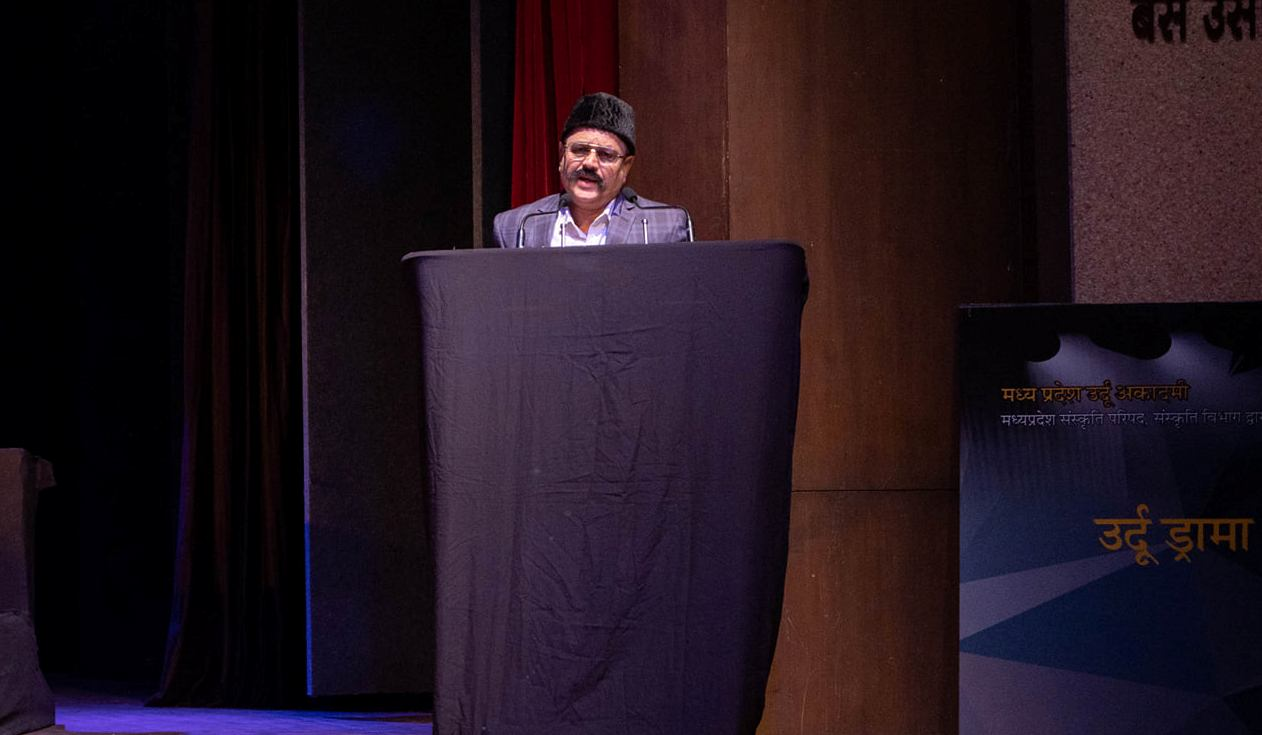
- A moment from drama "Ram, Imam-e-Hind, Naaz -e- Hind"
- Born: 8 February 1966 (age 60); Indore, Madhya Pradesh, India
- Education: Masters in Social Work
- Known for: Film and theatre director and actor
- Spouse: Sushma Shrotriya

Pranjal Shrotriya (born 8 February 1966) is an Indian actor, theatre director, social activist, documentary filmmaker and storyteller. Recognized for his contributions to the field of theater, Shrotriya is known for his productions that engage with societal issues.

In addition to his artistic pursuits, Shrotriya is the founder of Anant Terrace Theater, a theatre group located in Indore, Madhya Pradesh.

In Indore, Shrotriya has been actively involved in overseeing theatrical activities at his terrace theater for numerous years. The Terrace Theater, situated in Indore, consistently serves as a venue for various play performances. Shrotriya, a dedicated director and artist, has devoted three decades to the realms of theater and documentary filmmaking. His team diligently engages in the training of emerging artists and regularly stages theatrical productions.

== Stage involvement ==
Active in the field of theater since 1981, Pranjal Shrotriya has gained experience in theater, collaborating with various theater artists and directors, including Habib Tanveer, Prabhat Ganguly, M.K. Raina, Bansi Kaul, Leela Samson, Sanjeev Dixit, Alkhanandan, Rajkamal Nayak, Alok Chatterjee, Dadi Pudumjee, Dolly Walia, Ashok Bulani, P.U. Devra, Narendra Sharma, Bharat Sharma, Anand Shankar, Tripti Mitra, Vibha Rani, and others.

In addition to his involvement in the theater, Shrotriya actively collaborates with social organizations such as Seva Madhya Pradesh, Deenbandhu Social Organization, M.P.V.H.A, Pushpkunj, Bal Bhawan Indore, S.R.C. Bhopal, S.R.C. Indore, Indore Police, MPBGBS, MPVS, ZSS Vidisha, ZSS Indore, Hand in Hand, Jeevan Jyoti, Clinton Health Organization, and lends support to UNICEF projects.

Shrotriya engages in extensive collaboration with diverse theater organizations including, Manch Indore, Aradhana Group of Art and Culture, Spandan Indore, IPTA Indore, Halla Gulla Bal Natya Rang Shivir Indore, Rang Shree Little Ballet troop Bhopal, Nat Bundele, Rangvidushak, Shriram Bharatiya Kala Kendra New Delhi, Sabrang, Rangroopiya, Anant Theater, among others.

In terms of directing plays, Shrotriya has directed a variety of productions, including Hamlet, Vitthala, Andora, Rossum's Universal Robots, Yuddh ke viruddh kavitaen, Ashadh Ka Ek Din, Jangi Ram ki Haveli, Inspector Mata Din Chand Par, Andher Nagari Chaupat Raja, Thakur Ka Kuan, Sawa Ser Gehu, Jal Chakkar, Main Nadi Aansu Bhari, Moniya se Mahatma, Sheikh Chilli, Sher khoontee par tanga hai, Lorry War, Soopana Ka Sapana, Kissa Machhalee Machhuaare Ka, and more. Shrotriya has directed small and large plays, including plays involving unorganized labor women in Madhya Pradesh, and has conducted about 150 drama workshops. Additionally, he and his team actively participate in various theater festivals.

== Theatrical productions ==
- Hamlet written by William Shakespeare
- Inspector matadeen chand par written by Harishankar Parsai
- Thakur Ka Kuan (ठाकुर का कुआँ) written by Munshi Premchand
- Sawa Ser Gehun (सवा सेर गेहूँ) written by Munshi Premchand
- Panch Parmeshwar written by Munshi Premchand
- Kabuliwala written by Rabindranath Tagore
- Andorra written by Max Frisch
- Ashadh Ka Ek Din written by Mohan Rakesh
- Kanjoos written by Molière
- Bicchu (Scapin The Schemer) written by Molière
- Soopana Ka Sapana written by Shahid Anwar
