= The American Short Story =

American television anthology

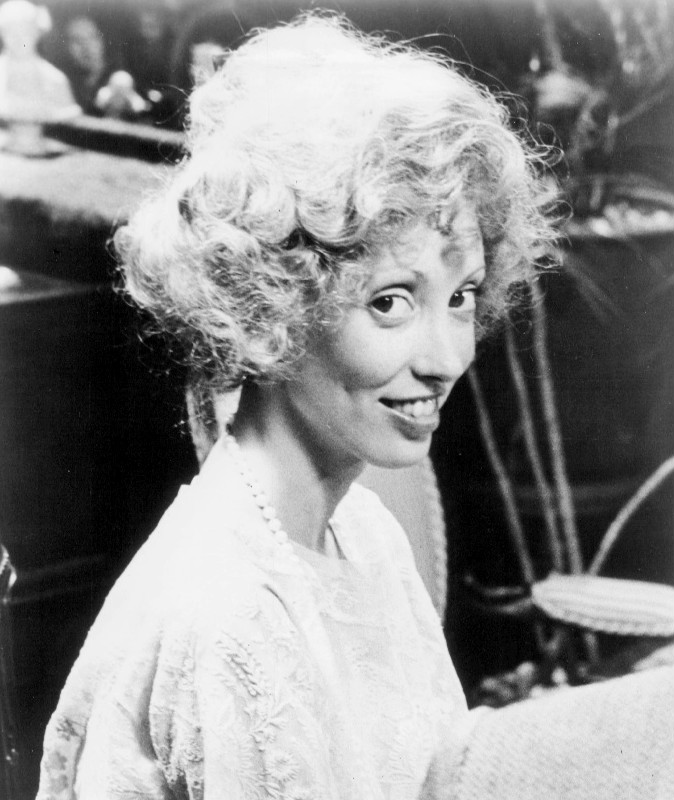
Photo of Shelley Duvall in the Episode “Bernice Bobs Her Hair”

The American Short Story is an American television anthology series produced by Learning in Focus and Sea Cliff Productions for the Public Broadcasting Service (PBS). It consisted of adaptations of short stories by both classic and contemporary American writers.

Robert Geller was the Executive Producer. Directors included Lamont Johnson, John Korty, Joan Micklin Silver, Ján Kadár, and Randa Haines. The series was hosted by Henry Fonda and Colleen Dewhurst. A total of 17 episodes aired on PBS from 1974 to 1980.

== Episodes ==
| Year | Episode Title | Author | Director | Cast |
|---|---|---|---|---|
| 1974 | The Music School | John Updike | John Korty | Ron Weyand, Colleen Dewhurst |
| 1974 | Parker Adderson, Philosopher | Ambrose Bierce | Arthur Barron | Douglass Watson, Harris Yulin, Darren O'Connor |
| 1975 | The Jolly Corner | Henry James | Arthur Barron | Salome Jens, Fritz Weaver |
| 1976 | Bernice Bobs Her Hair | F. Scott Fitzgerald | Joan Micklin Silver | Shelley Duvall, Veronica Cartwright, Henry Fonda |
| 1977 | Almos' a Man | Richard Wright | Stan Lathan | LeVar Burton, Madge Sinclair |
| 1977 | I'm a Fool | Sherwood Anderson | Noel Black | Ron Howard, Amy Irving, Henry Fonda |
| 1977 | The Displaced Person | Flannery O'Connor | Glenn Jordan | Irene Worth, Samuel L. Jackson, Henry Fonda |
| 1977 | The Blue Hotel | Stephen Crane | Jan Kadar | David Warner, James Keach, Henry Fonda |
| 1977 | Soldier's Home | Ernest Hemingway | Robert Young | Richard Backus, Nancy Marchand, Henry Fonda |
| 1980 | The Golden Honeymoon | Ring Lardner | Noel Black | James Whitmore, Teresa Wright, Henry Fonda |
| 1980 | Paul's Case | Willa Cather | Lamont Johnson | Eric Roberts, Lindsay Crouse |
| 1980 | The Man That Corrupted Hadleyburg | Mark Twain | Ralph Rosenblum | Robert Preston, Tom Aldredge |
| 1980 | Barn Burning | William Faulkner | Peter Werner | Tommy Lee Jones, Diane Kagan, Henry Fonda |
| 1980 | Rappaccini's Daughter | Nathaniel Hawthorne | Deszo Magyar | Kristoffer Tabori, Kathleen Beller, Henry Fonda |
| 1980 | The Sky is Gray | Ernest J. Gaines | Stan Lathan | Olivia Cole, Cleavon Little |
| 1980 | The Jilting of Granny Weatherall | Katherine Anne Porter | Randa Haines | Geraldine Fitzgerald, Lois Smith |
| 1980 | The Greatest Man in the World | James Thurber | Ralph Rosenblum | Brad Davis, Carol Kane |
