= Bharatendu Academy of Dramatic Arts =

Theatre training institute in India

- Type: Public
- Established: 1975
- Parent institution: Government of Uttar Pradesh (Ministry of Culture)
- Affiliations: Bhatkhande Sanskriti Vishwavidyalaya (2023 - present)
- Chairman: Shri Mukesh Kumar Meshram
- Director: Mr. Bipin Kumar
- Location: Lucknow, Uttar Pradesh, India; 26.853374°N 80.994849°E
- Campus: Urban
- Website: http://bnalko.in/

Bharatendu Academy of Dramatic Arts or Bharatendu Natya Akademi is a theatre training institute in Lucknow, India. It is named after Bharatendu Harishchandra, father of Hindi theatre. It offers a two-year full-time diploma course in theatre training. It is an autonomous organisation under the Ministry of Culture, Government of Uttar Pradesh.

== History ==
Bharatendu Natya Academy came into existence as a drama institute on 2 July 1975 by efforts of the theatre personality Raj Bisaria.

In 1975 its name was Bharatendu Natya Kendra and the class was running at the mini Rabindralay (near Lucknow Railway Station). At that time, BNA did not have their own building; now it functions from the Bharatendu Bhawan in Gomti Nagar (Vikas Khand-1), Lucknow.

In 1981 the institute started providing a two-year full-time diploma (Master in Dramatic Arts degree since 2023–24 academic year awarded/affiliated by Bhatkhande Sanskriti Vishwavidyalaya) course in theatre training. The institute today selects 20 candidates every year for its two-year intensive post-graduate diploma course with scholarships for the first 12 students. Raj Bisaria was the founder-director. Hindi writer Amritlal Nagar was the first nominated chairperson of the institute. Today Bharatendu Natya Academy has become the second of its kind in India after the National School of Drama, New Delhi. At the end of their course, the second-year students make a visit to the Film and Television Institute of India, Pune or Satyajit Ray Film and Television Institute, Kolkata for the basic training for film and television. This is a kind of extension program that is done with the financial support of Film Bandhu (a body under the Cultural Department of the U.P. Government).

== Performing spaces ==
The institute has three auditoriums within the campus:

- B M Shah Auditorium
- Thrust Theatre Auditorium

Apart from that it has a studio theatre and minor performances spaces used on special occasions, During Workshop & Festival.

== Notable alumni ==
- Nalneesh Neel
- Alok Pandey
- Jagat Rawat
- Anupam Shyam
- Nawazuddin Siddiqui
- Rajpal Yadav

== See also ==
- Bharatendu Harishchandra
- Bhatkhande Sanskriti Vishwavidyalaya
- Faculty of Fine Arts, University of Lucknow
- Film and Television Institute of India
- Madhya Pradesh School of Drama
- National Institute of Dramatic Art
- National School of Drama
- National School of Drama, Varanasi
- Satyajit Ray Film and Television Institute
- State Institute of Film and Television
