= Soldier's Home =

Short story by Ernest Hemingway

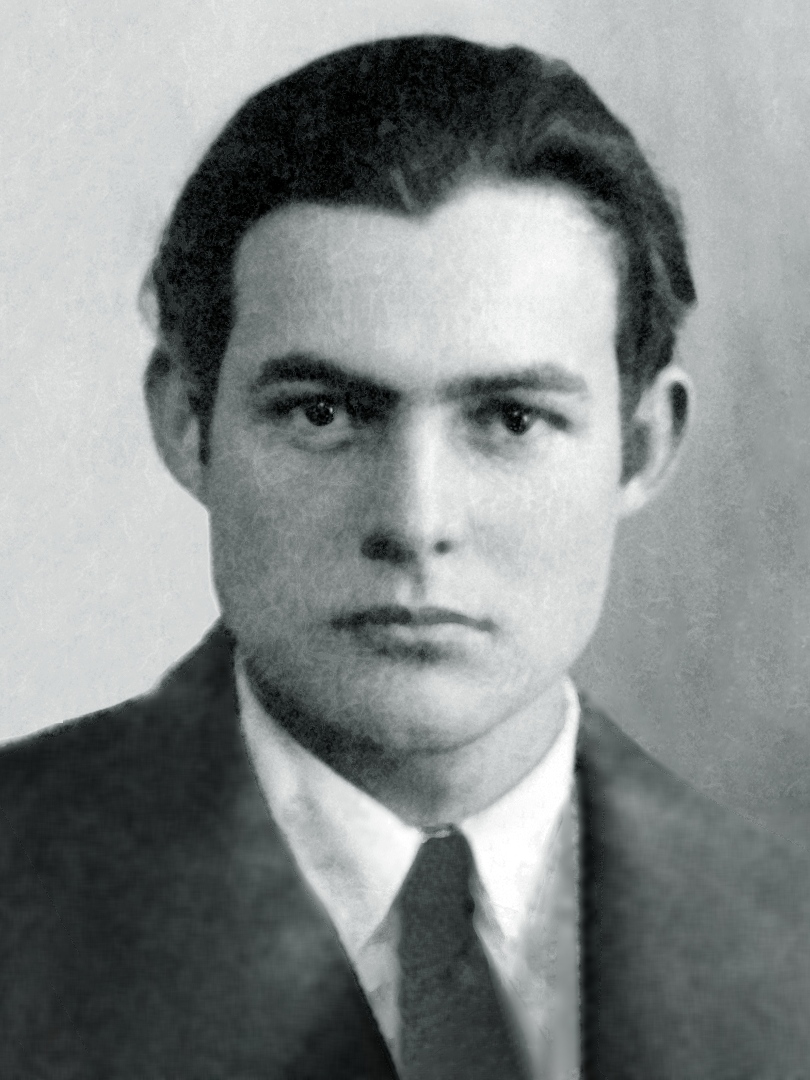
Ernest Hemingway in 1923

"Soldier's Home" is a short story by Ernest Hemingway. It was included in the 1925 Contact Collection of Contemporary Writers and published by Boni & Liveright in Hemingway's 1925 New York collection short stories, In Our Time. The story's protagonist is Harold Krebs, a young man who is unhappy after he returns home from serving in World War I.

== Summary ==
The story begins with a very brief background of Krebs' life. Before the war, he attended a Methodist college in Kansas where he was part of a fraternity. In 1917, Krebs enlisted in the Marines and did not return to the United States from Germany until 1919.

By the time of his return to his home state of Oklahoma, the town has already given the returned soldiers a big, elaborate welcoming; Krebs’ return seems late and irrelevant as the war had already been over for some time. Krebs was involved in the battles at Belleau Wood, Soissons, the Champagne, St. Mihiel, and the Argonne Forest. At first, Krebs did not want to share his experiences, but as time progressed at home, he wanted to talk about the war but no one wanted to listen. Krebs lies about his wartime accounts in order to gain an audience, though he does not want a ton.

By late summer, Krebs is doing typical things: he sleeps in late, reads books, plays pool and his clarinet, goes for walks and reads. He has no interest getting a girlfriend. He just looks at girls because they are pretty, but he does not want to have to work to get one.

About a month after his return, his mother requests that he come downstairs to eat breakfast. While Krebs is eating breakfast he reads the newspaper and talks to his sister, and they discuss her baseball prowess. They also discuss her calling him her "beau" to her friends, and he says that he loves her.

The conversation ends as his mother comes back into the room and asks to speak with Krebs. His mother says God cannot have any idle hands in his Kingdom. Krebs replies that he is not in His Kingdom. He then feels embarrassed for saying that. Krebs’ mother then tells him that she understands how he feels, and that she is worried about him. She says that her father told her about his own service in the Civil War and that she has been praying for Krebs because she knows how he must feel. She then asks if Krebs loves her, and he says no; she cries. Krebs states that he doesn't love anybody. Krebs then realizes that he won't be able to make her understand and saying that will only hurt her. He says that he did not mean what he said but he does not love anyone anymore. Krebs begs her to believe that he did not mean it and so she prays for him.

The story concludes with Krebs plotting to leave his hometown and get a job in Kansas City.

== Style and themes ==
In the 1920s, Hemingway was inspired by Ezra Pound's writings and applied the poet's principles of imagism to his own early work. Hemingway's short stories from the 1920s adhere to Pound's tight definition of imagism; biographer Carlos Baker writes that in his short stories Hemingway tried to learn how to "get the most from the least, [to] prune language, [to] multiply intensities, [to] tell nothing but the truth in a way that allowed for telling more than the truth". Hemingway adapted this style into a technique he called his iceberg theory: as Baker describes it, the hard facts float above water while the supporting structure, including the symbolism, operates out of sight.

== Symbolism ==
Harold Krebs' name itself is a symbol, according to Ullrich; "Harold" "is an old English name meaning army power or army ruler," while "Krebs" also had German ties to the word crab, which is a metaphor for Krebs’ crab-like shell his experiences gave him.

The way that Harold has changed represents how America has been changed from the war. His values were changed now, like how America has been challenged from changing values to more modern times (Smelstor Soldier's).

Krebs’ home plays a large role in the story as well. On his porch, Krebs sits and observes the women of his town, much like how trenches in warfare allow a vantage point to observe enemy's movements. Here, Krebs' home is represented in such a way that can be related to Krebs’ wartime experiences.

The map is another symbol. Krebs is reading a book about the war but he wished it had many more detailed maps. This symbolizes how now he is searching for direction in his own life, how he wishes his life would be mapped out. For the past two years he has been in the army listening to directions, now he is free and does not know what to do.

A final symbol is the photograph in the beginning of the story. It describes Krebs and his fraternity brothers all of whom were wearing exactly the same thing. This shows "the conformist mentality of prewar, midwestern America" (Smelstor What's).

== Television adaptation ==
Soldier's Home was adapted to a PBS television movie in 1977.

== Sources ==
- Baker, Carlos (1981). Ernest Hemingway Selected Letters 1917–1961. New York: Charles Scribner's Sons. ISBN 978-0-684-16765-7
- Benson, Jackson (1975). "Ernest Hemingway as Short Story Writer". in Benson, Jackson (ed). The Short Stories of Ernest Hemingway: Critical Essays. Durham NC: Duke University Press. ISBN 978-0-8223-0320-6
- Meyers, Jeffrey (1985). Hemingway: A Biography. New York: Macmillan. ISBN 978-0-333-42126-0
- Oliver, Charles (1999). Ernest Hemingway A to Z: The Essential Reference to the Life and Work. New York: Checkmark Publishing. ISBN 978-0-8160-3467-3
- Hemingway, Ernest. "Soldier’s Home" The Bedford Introduction to Literature: Reading, Thinking, Writing, 11th ed, edited by Michael Meyer, Bedford/St. Martin's, 2015, pp. 162–166.
- De Baerdemaeker, Ruben. "Performative Patterns in Hemingway's 'Soldier's Home'." The Hemingway Review, no. 1, 2007, p. 55.
- Smelstor, Marjorie. "Soldier’s Home." Masterplots II: Short Story Series, Revised Edition, January 2004, pp. 1–2.
- Smelstor, Marjorie. "Soldier's Home by Ernest Hemingway." Salem Press Encyclopedia of Literature, 2016.
- Imamura, Tateo. "'Soldier's Home': Another Story of a Broken Heart." The Hemingway Review, no. 1, 1996, p. 102.
- Ullrich, David W. ""What's in a Name?"—Krebs, Crabs, Kraut: The Multivalence of "Krebs" in Hemingway's Soldier's Home." Studies in Short Fiction, vol. 29, Summer92, pp. 363–375.
