= Bharatendu Harishchandra =

Indian writer and poet (1850–1885)

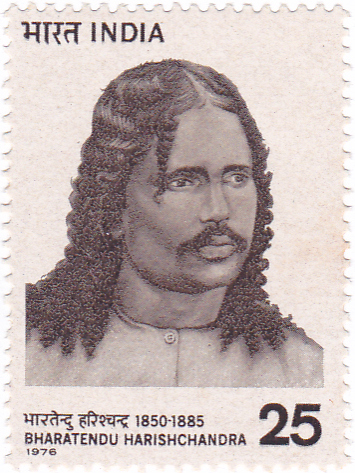
- Born: 9 September 1850; Benares, Benares State, British India
- Died: 6 January 1885 (aged 34); Benares, Benares State, British India
- Occupations: Novelist, poet, playwright
- Writing career
- Pen name: Rasa
- Language: Hindi
- Notable work: Andher Nagari

Bharatendu Harishchandra (9 September 1850 – 6 January 1885) was an Indian poet, writer, and playwright. He authored several dramas, biographical sketches, and travel accounts with the goal of influencing public opinion. He is often considered the father of modern Hindi literature and theatre, and some modern Indian authors have described him as a Yug Charan for his writing depicting the exploitative nature of the British Raj.

Writing under the pen name "Rasa", Harishchandra explored themes that portrayed the struggles of the Indian people. His works addressed issues such as poverty, dependency, British tyranny, middle-class unrest, and need for societal progress. Harishchandra opposed the conventional orthodoxy of the time and the manipulations of religious leaders. He is described by some as an influential Hindu traditionalist who used Vaishnava devotion to define a coherent Hindu religion.

== Biography ==
Bharatendu Harishchandra was born in Benaras into a wealthy Bania family. His father Girdhar Das was a poet and both his parents died when he was young. His ancestors were landlords in Bengal. An important event in Harishchandra's life was hiss journey at the age of 15 to the Jagannath temple with his family in 1865, described by Acharya Ramchandra Shukla. According to records, during this trip, he was deeply moved by the Bengal Renaissance and decided to translate social, historical, and Puranic plays and novels into Hindi. This decision was reflected in his Hindi translation of the Bengali drama Vidyasundar, three years later, in 1868.

By age 17, Harishchandra was already known for his literary talents. Harishchandra edited the magazines Kavi Vachan Sudha, Harishchandra Magazine, and Bala Bodhini. He wrote under the pseudonym Girdhar Das. He was titled "Bharatendu" ("The moon of India") at a public meeting by scholars of Kashi in 1880 in recognition of his services as a writer, patron, and modernizer. Ram Vilas Sharma refers to the "great literary awakening ushered in under Bharatendu's leadership" as the "second story of the edifice of renascent Hindi", the first being the Indian Rebellion of 1857.

Harishchandra was married and had one daughter.

== Hindu traditionalism ==
According to Barbara and Thomas R. Metcalf, Harishchandra was a Hindu traditionalist in North India, promoting the continuity of received tradition and self-conscious participation with the modern world. He rejected the authority of those engaged with Western learning and institutions over Hindu religious matters and recommended they be left to traditionally educated Hindu scholars. He used new media, especially publications, to shape public opinion. In doing so, he contributed to the development of modern forms of the Hindi language.

Harishchandra used Vaishnava devotion to try and define a coherent Hindu religion, using as his institutional base the Kashi Dharma Sabha, which was started in the 1860s by the Maharaja of Benares as a response to more radical Hindu reformist movements. Harishchandra insisted on the value of image worship and interpreted Bhakti as devotion to a single god; this was in response to Orientalist and Christian critiques of Hinduism.

Although Urdu has been used as the lingua franca across North India since the 18th Century, Harishchandra espoused the cause of reviving Hindi as part of his cultural and nationalist activities. He started a campaign to promote the use of Swadeshi articles with demands for replacement of Urdu by Hindi in courts and for a ban on cattle slaughter in India. He continued his campaign for a legal ban on cow slaughter on behalf of the Maharaja of Benares, taking it to the Delhi Durbar. According to Sahay, his petition on the ban had 60,000 signatories and was submitted to Lord Lytton. Though no action was taken on the ban, he was given the title "Vir Vaishnava".

== Major works ==
=== Plays ===
Bharatendu Harishchandra soon became a director, manager, and playwright. He used theatre as a tool to shape public opinion. His major plays are:

- Vaidika Himsa Na Bhavati, 1873 (वैदिक हिंसा न भवति)
- Satya Harishchandra, 1876 (सत्य हरिश्चन्द्र)
- Bharat Durdasha, 1875
- Niladevi, 1881 (नीलदेवी)
- Andher Nagari (अन्धेर नगरी, City of Darkness), 1881: A popular play of modern Hindi drama and a political satire. Translated and performed in many Indian languages by prominent Indian directors like B. V. Karanth, Prasanna, Arvind Gaur and Sanjay Upadhyaya.

=== Poetry ===
- Bhakta Sarvagya (भक्त सर्वज्ञ)
- Prem Malika (प्रेम मालिका), 1872
- Prem Madhuri (प्रेम माधुरी), 1875
- Prem Tarang (प्रेम तरंग),1877
- Prem Prakalpa (प्रेम प्रकल्प), Prem Phulwari (प्रेम फुलवारी) and Prem Sarowar (प्रेम सरोवर), 1883
- Holi (होली), (1874)
- Madhumukul (मधुमुकुल), 1881
- Raga Sangrah (राग संग्रह), 1880
- Varsha Vinod (वर्षा विनोद), 1880
- Vinay Prem Pachasa (विनय प्रेम पचासा), 1881
- Phulon Ka Guchchha (फूलों का गुच्छा), 1882
- Chandravali (चन्द्रावली), 1876 and Krishnacharitra (कृष्णचरित्र), 1883
- Uttarardha Bhaktamal (उत्तरार्द्ध भक्तमाल), 1876–77
- Nij Bhasha (निज भाषा), 1877
- India's Plight (भारत दुर्दशा), 1875

=== Translations ===
- Harsha's Ratnavali (रत्नावली)
- Vishakhadatta's Mudrarakshasa (मुद्राराक्षस)
- Ramprasad Sen's Vidyasundar (विद्यासुन्दर) from Bengali
- Karpuramanjari (कर्पूरमञ्जरी) from Prakrit
- Shakespeare's Merchant of Venice as Durlabh Bandhu (दुर्लभ बन्धु) Invaluable Friend

=== Essay collection ===
- Bharatendu Granthavali (भारतेन्दु ग्रन्थावली), 1885

== Bharatendu Harishchandra Awards ==
The Ministry of Information and Broadcasting of India has awarded the Bharatendu Harishchandra Awards since 1983 to promote original Hindi mass communication writings.

== See also ==
- Bharatendu Natya Academy
- Moti Chandra
