= National School of Drama, Varanasi =

Drama School

- Type: Public
- Established: 19 August 2018
- Parent institution: National School of Drama
- Affiliations: Sangeet Natak Academy
- Director: Pravin Kumar Gunjan
- Location: Shri Nagari Natak Mandali, Kabir Churaha, Kotwali, Varanasi (U.P.) – 221001, Varanasi; 25.321712°N 83.005976°E
- Campus: Urban
- Website: varanasi.nsd.gov.in

National School of Drama, Varanasi is a new extension center of National School of Drama, New Delhi, established in 2018 to provide one-year training on Indian Classical Theatre and Natyashashtra. It is an autonomous institution under the Ministry of Culture, Government of India.

== Course ==
The center only accepts students from India for a one-year residential training on Indian Classical Theatre and Natyashashtra.

== Plays Curated ==
- Svapnavasavadattam
- Satyavadi Raja Harish Chandra
- Bhagwadajjukam
- Abhijjan Shakuntalam
- Abhijjan Shakuntalam
- Rang Sangeet

== Festivals ==
- Rang Kashi
- Bharat Rang Mahotsav
- Benaras Rang Mohatsav

== Repertory ==
Dedicated to the tradition of natya shastra, the National School of Drama has set up a Repertory Varanasi centre, a one-of-its-kind, the center in 2018.

== See also ==
- Education in India
- Education in Varanasi
- National School of Drama
- Bharatendu Academy of Dramatic Arts
