= Adirang Mahotsav =

Theatre festival in India

Adirang Mahotsav is a theatre festival organised by India's National School of Drama. It is a tribal festival organised to showcase rural life of India. It is a festival dedicated to tribal art and culture in India.

== History ==
The very first festival was held in Mumbai in 2014. Since it started, it has traveled to many different cities across India, including Hyderabad, Surat, Raipur, Port Blair, Nasik and Dwarkonda. In 2017, a big edition was held in Keonjhar, Odisha, where artists from 16 states came together. Another event at Hyderabad in the same year featured 28 different tribal dance forms. The festival had to stop for a few years after the 2019 event because of the COVID-19 pandemic. Before COVID-19 pandemic, the last edition took place in Shantiniketan, West Bengal.

== The 2025 Event Highlights ==
In 2025, the festival was held in New Delhi for the first time. This was the 7th edition of the event. It took place from March 21 to March 23 on the National School of Drama campus. About 300 tribal artists from many parts of India traveled to Delhi to perform and show their work. The festival featured special plays that tell stories about tribal history and heroes. One of the main plays was a "Bir Birsa". That was a tribute to Birsa Munda, a famous hero who fought for the rights of tribal people. "Bana Guda" is a play from Odisha that tells stories about bravery. People also watched many traditional dances, such as the "Rabha dance" from Assam, the "Siddi Dhamal" from Gujarat and the "Paika dance" from Jharkhand. There is a daily Craft market, where people can see and buy things made by tribal artists. Visitors can find handloom textiles, bamboo, clay work, Madhubani paintings, brass, wire art and leather craft.

== Academic Importance ==
The Adirang Mahotsav-2025 includes national seminars and masterclasses led by experts to explore tribal traditions in depth. A 2025 seminar titled "Centring the Margin: Mainstreaming Indigenous Performance Traditions of India" emphasized the importance of research and documentation of tribal heritage.

== Cultural Significance ==
The festival is described the deep-rooted connection between tribal populations and the natural world. It highlights how tribal lifestyles often maintain an ecological balance and portrays the "unity in diversity" inherent in Indian culture.
