= Neelam Mansingh Chowdhry =

Indian theatre artist

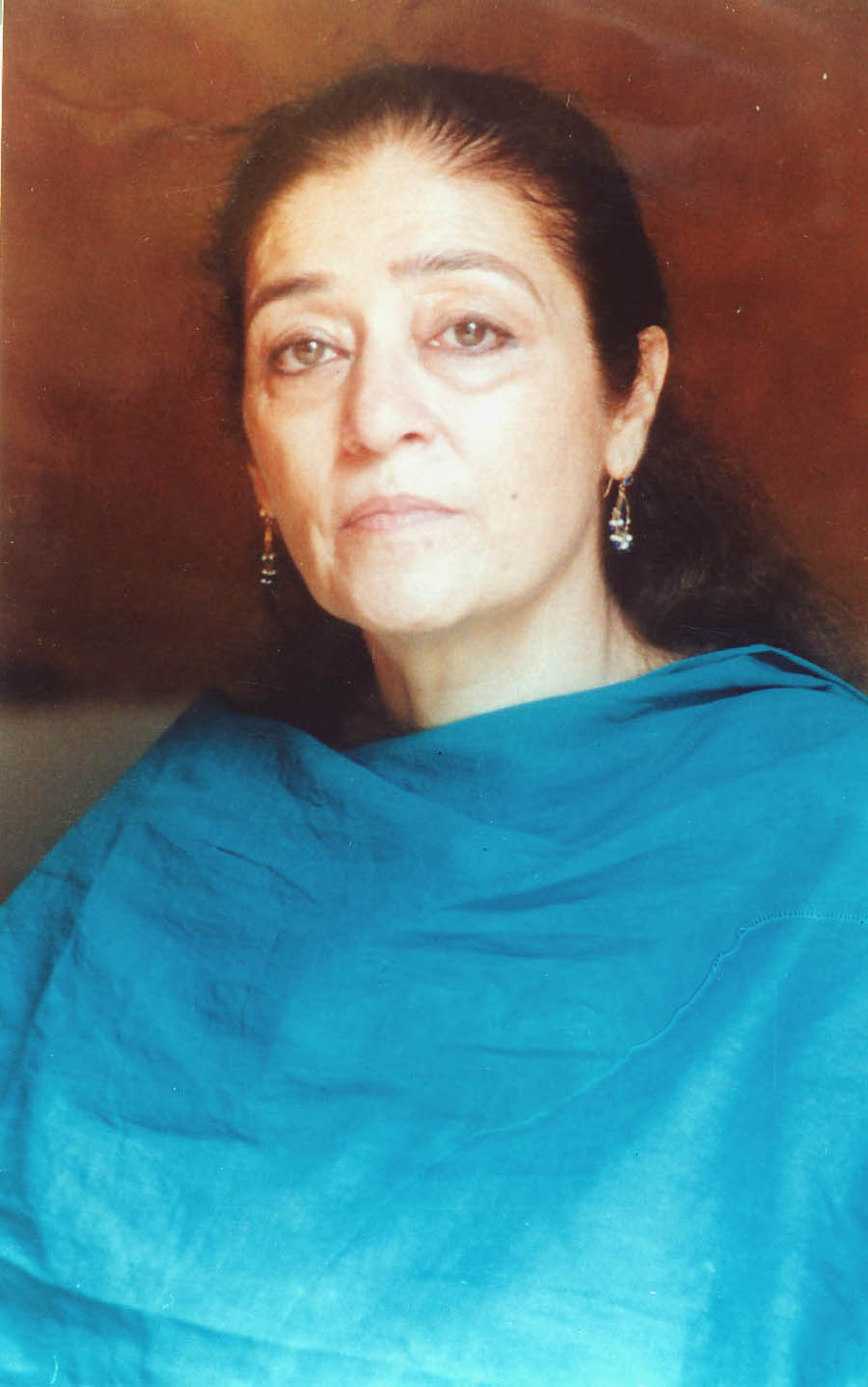
- Chowdhry in 2004
- Born: 14 April 1950 (age 76); Amritsar
- Occupations: Theatre Director, Theatre educator
- Years active: 1975-present
- Organization: The Company (1984)
- Spouse: Pushvinder Singh Chowdhry
- Children: Angad Singh Chowdhry, Kabir Singh Chowdhry
- Awards: Sangeet Natak Akademi Award (2003); Padma Shri Award (2011)

Neelam Man Singh Chowdhry (born 14 April 1950) is an Indian theatre actor and director based in Chandigarh. She was awarded the Sangeet Natak Akademi Award in 2003 for Direction and the Padma Shri Award in 2011. She taught at Department of Indian Theatre at Panjab University since 1990, and is serving as a Professor Emeritus at Panjab University. Chowdhry is the artistic director of The Company, a theatre group she founded in 1983.

== Biography ==
=== Early life and education ===
Neelam was born in 1950 and grew up in Amritsar, Punjab. She finished her Master's degree in art history from the Punjab University, Chandigarh. She graduated from the National School of Drama in Delhi in 1975 and trained under Ebrahim Alkazi.

=== Career ===
After her training, Chowdhry worked in Mumbai with Naseeruddin Shah and Om Puri in the theatre group Majma.n 1979, Chowdhry moved to Bhopal, where she at Rangmandal repertory of Bharat Bhavan, under theatre director B. V. Karanth In 1984, she relocated to Chandigarh and established her theatre group, The Company. She subsequently joined the Department of Indian Theatre at Panjab University in 1990, where she also served as chairperson and later Professor Emeritus.

== Personal life ==
In 1980, she had her first child, Angad Singh Chowdhry, and in 1985, she had her second child, Kabir Singh Chowdhry.

== Works ==
Her well-known plays include Kitchen Katha, The Suit, Yerma, Nagamandala, The Mad Woman of Chaillot, Little Eyolf, Bitter Fruit, Naked Voices, Stree Patra and Gumm Hai.
