= Moti Chandra =

Indian art historian

Moti Chandra (1909–1974) was an Indian scholar, art historian, and author. He was a descendant of Bharatendu Harishchandra, the creator of modern Hindi prose, and was well known for his contributions to art history. He was from Varanasi. His areas of study included the Kingdom of Kapisa.

== Major works ==
- "Trade And Trade Routes In Ancient India"
- "The World of Courtesans"
- "Mewar Painting in the Seventeenth Century"
- "Indian Art"
- "Stone Sculpture in the Prince of Wales Museum"
- "Kashi ka Itihas" (History of Kashi)
- "Costumes, Textiles, Cosmetics & Coiffure in Ancient and Mediaeval India"
- "The Golden Flute: Indian Painting and Poetry"
- "Jain Miniature Paintings from Western India"
- "Ikat Fabrics of Orissa and Andhra Pradesh (Study of Contemporary Textile Crafts of India)"
- "Indian Ivories"
- "New Documents of Jaina Painting"
