= Alok Chatterjee =

Indian theatre actor and director (1960 or 1961 – 2025)

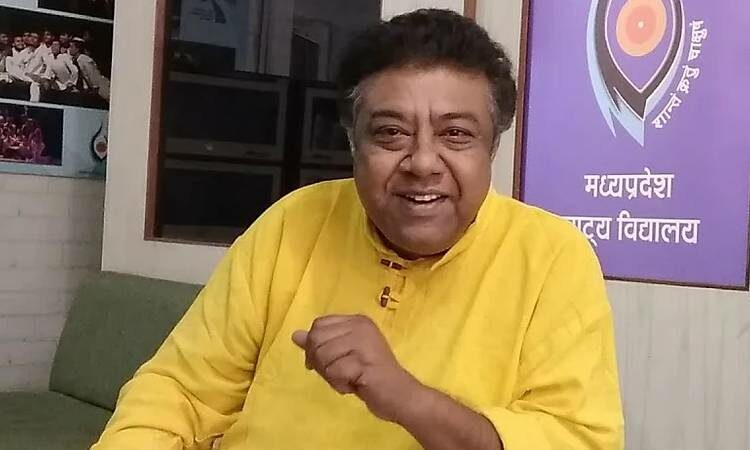
- Alok Chatterjee at Madhya Pradesh School Of Drama, drama school in Bhopal, Madhya Pradesh
- Born: 1960 or 1961; Damoh, Madhya Pradesh, India
- Died: 6 January 2025 (aged 64)
- Education: National School of Drama
- Occupations: Theatre actor, stage director
- Years active: 1987–2025
- Known for: Death of a Salesman (stage play)

Alok Chatterjee (1960 or 1961 – 6 January 2025) was an Indian theatre actor and director known for his theatre productions like Death of a Salesman, Nat Samrat and #Anandmath latest play 2022. He has been teaching at NSD and Pune based FTII. He also taught acting in the institute of Anupam Kher, Actor Prepress in Mumbai. At present, Chatterjee, in Madhya Pradesh Natya Vidyalaya Bhopal, is known for his vast range of acting (teaching) with deep literary understanding. He is a gold medalist from the National School of Drama, Delhi for best acting. At present Alok Chatterjee does theatre in his hometown at Bhopal. He was also awarded Sangeet Natak Akademi Award for the year 2019 by the president of India Droupadi Murmu at Vigyan Bhavan, New Delhi.

== Life and career ==
Alok Chatterjee was born in Madhya Pradesh, to a Hindu family. He earned a scholarship to study at National School of Drama (NSD) in New Delhi in 1987. Actor Irfan Khan was his batchmate in NSD. When he was in Mumbai alcohol and some other chaos pushed them into oblivion. "It's hard to walk home In the words of Chatterjee who worshiped both times, Mahakal (Shiva), "It was the effect of fifty-seven years ago." (वह साढ़े साती का असर था)"

Chatterjee died on 6 January 2025, at the age of 64.

== Plays ==
Play	Author	Actor	Director	Notes
Krishnaarjun Yuddh	MakhanlalChaturvedi		Yes	Krishnaarjun Yuddh
Buget ki raat ek shahar mein	shankar shesh		Yes	
Fandi	ShankarShesh		Yes	
ek tha gadha urf aladad khan	SharadJoshi			
A Midsummer Night's Dream	William Shakespeare		Yes	
Death of a Salesman	Arthur Miller	Yes	Yes	
Nat Samrat	Vishnu Vaman Shirwadkar	Yes	Jayant Deshmukh	
Sakuntala ki anghuthi	Surendra Verma		Yes	
Swami Vivekanand		Yes	Yes	
Ankahe Afsane			Yes	

== Notable students ==
Manav Kaul

== Sources ==
- "Bhopal: Alok Chatterjee feted with Sangeet Natak Akademi Award". Free Press Journal.
