= Nancy Marchand =

American actress (1928–2000)

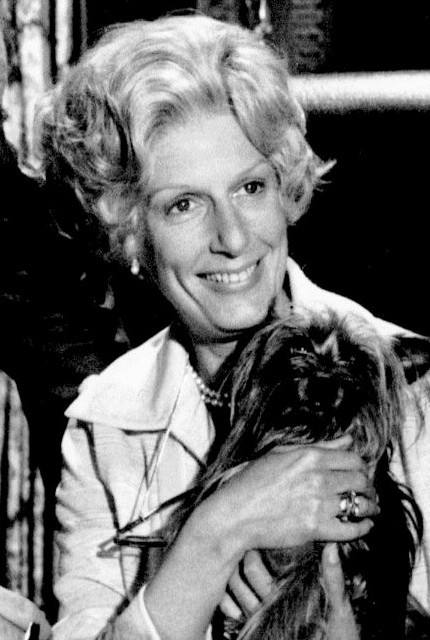
- Marchand in Lou Grant (1977)
- Born: Nancy Lou Marchand; June 19, 1928; Buffalo, New York, U.S.
- Died: June 18, 2000 (aged 71); Stratford, Connecticut, U.S.
- Education: Carnegie Mellon University (BFA)
- Occupation: Actress
- Years active: 1946–2000
- Spouse: Paul Sparer (m. 1951; died 1999)
- Children: 3

Nancy Lou Marchand (June 19, 1928 – June 18, 2000) was an American actress. Known for her performances on stage and screen, her accolades include four Primetime Emmy Awards and a Golden Globe Award, as well as nomination for a Tony Award.

Marchand began her career in theater. She was most famous for portraying Margaret Pynchon on Lou Grant – for which she won four Emmy Awards – and Livia Soprano on The Sopranos, for which she won a Golden Globe Award.

== Early life ==
Marchand was born in 1928 in Buffalo, New York, the only child of Dr. Raymond Louis Marchand, a dentist, and his wife, Marjorie Freeman, a piano teacher. Her great-grandfather Louis Marchand, a stone cutter, emigrated from France. She grew up in the adjacent hamlet of Eggertsville, New York. She attended Amherst High School, and studied acting at the Studio Theatre School in Buffalo, taking two buses to make the trip. She graduated from the Carnegie Institute of Technology in 1949 and studied theater at the Herbert Berghof Studio in New York City.

== Career ==
Marchand made her first professional stage appearance in 1946 in The Late George Apley in Ogunquit, Maine. She made her Broadway debut in The Taming of the Shrew in 1951. She won a Distinguished Performance Obie Award for The Balcony, and she was nominated for the Tony Award for Best Performance by a Leading Actress in a Play for The White Liars & Black Comedy. She was nominated four times for the Drama Desk Award, winning for Morning's at Seven. She won a second Obie for her performance in A. R. Gurney's The Cocktail Hour.

In 1953, she made her television debut starring opposite Rod Steiger on The Philco Television Playhouse in the television play Marty. Marchand originated the roles of Vinnie Phillips on the CBS soap opera Love of Life and Theresa Lamonte on the NBC soap opera Another World. She also starred as matriarch Edith Cushing on Lovers and Friends, a short-lived soap opera.

Marchand was renowned for her roles as patrician newspaper publisher Margaret Pynchon on Lou Grant, winning four Emmy Awards as Best Supporting Actress in a Dramatic Series, and as matriarch Livia Soprano, mother of Tony Soprano on the HBO series The Sopranos, which earned her a Golden Globe Award and a Screen Actors Guild Award for Outstanding Performance by an Ensemble in a Drama Series, as well as two Emmy Award nominations.

She appeared in many anthology series in the early days of television, including The Philco Television Playhouse (on which she starred in Marty opposite Rod Steiger), Kraft Television Theatre, Studio One, and Playhouse 90. Additional television credits include The Law and Mr. Jones, Spenser: For Hire, Law & Order, Homicide: Life on the Street, Coach, and Night Court.

Marchand's feature film credits included The Bachelor Party, Ladybug Ladybug, Me, Natalie, Tell Me That You Love Me, Junie Moon, The Hospital, The Bostonians, From the Hip, Jefferson in Paris, Brain Donors, Reckless, The Naked Gun, Sabrina, and Dear God.

Marchand's death occurred between Seasons 2 and 3 of The Sopranos, before a plot line prominently involving her character was resolved. Her death was written into the plot, and one final scene was created for her using computer-generated imagery, which was a groundbreaking technology at the time, together with outtakes from previous seasons.

== Personal life ==
Marchand was married to actor Paul Sparer. He died in 1999 from cancer. The couple had three children: Katie, David, and Rachel, and seven grandchildren.

A long time chain smoker, Marchand suffered from lung cancer, emphysema, and COPD. She died on June 18, 2000 in Stratford, Connecticut, the day before her 72nd birthday. She was posthumously inducted into the American Theater Hall of Fame.

== Filmography ==
=== Film ===
Year	Title	Role	Notes
1954	Three Steps to Start		Producer, Julien Bryan International Film Foundation NYU
1957	The Bachelor Party	Mrs. Julie Samson	
1963	Ladybug Ladybug	Mrs. Andrews	
1969	Me, Natalie	Edna Miller	
1970	Tell Me That You Love Me, Junie Moon	Nurse Oxford	
1971	The Hospital	Mrs. Christie	
1984	The Bostonians	Mrs. Burrage	
1987	From the Hip	Roberta Winnaker	
1988	The Naked Gun: From the Files of Police Squad!	Mayor Barkley	
1991	Regarding Henry	Headmistress	Uncredited
1992	Brain Donors	Lillian Oglethorpe	
1995	Jefferson in Paris	Madame Abbesse	
1995	Reckless	Grandmother	
1995	Sabrina	Maude Larrabee	
1996	Dear God	Judge Kits Van Heynigan	

=== Television ===
Year	Title	Role	Notes
1950	Westinghouse Studio One	Jo March	2 episodes
1951	Lux Video Theatre	Joan	Episode: "Forever Walk Free"
1951–1958	Kraft Theatre	Abby	9 episodes
1953	Studio One in Hollywood	Miss Marmon	Episode: "The Hospital"
1953	The Philco Television Playhouse	Clara	Episode: "Marty"
1953	Lux Video Theatre	Phyllis	Episode: "Two for Tea"
1954	Pond's Theater	Charlotte	4 episodes
1957	Studio One in Hollywood	Eleanor	Episode: "Rudy"
1957	The United States Steel Hour	Gen Arnold	Episode: "Windfall"
1957	Shirley Temple's Storybook	Queen	Episode: "The Sleeping Beauty"
1958	Playhouse 90	Sylvia Sands	Episode: "Free Weekend"
1959	Armstrong Circle Theatre	Mrs. Howard Jones	Episode: "Miracle at Spring Hill"
1959	Playhouse 90	Mrs. Yarbrough	Episode: "The Hidden Image"
1959	NBC Sunday Showcase	Mrs. Clegg	Episode: "The Indestructible Mr. Gore"
1959	R.C.M.P.	Gerta Boyd	Episode: "Little Girl Lost"
1959	The Bells of St. Mary's	Sister Michael	TV movie
1960	Play of the Week	Margaret	2 episodes
1960	The Law and Mr. Jones	Dorothy	Episode: "The Long Echo"
1961	The Defenders	Mrs. Crile	Episode: "The Attack"
1962	Naked City	Esther Lindall	Episode: "The Multiplicity of Herbert Konish"
1964	The Defenders	Rhoda Banter	Episode: "Hollow Triumph"
1972	Look Homeward, Angel	Madame Elizabeth	TV movie
1975	Beacon Hill	Mary Lassiter	13 episodes
1976	Another World	Theresa Lamonte	Unknown episodes
1977–1982	Lou Grant	Margaret Pynchon	99 episodes
1977	Soldier's Home	Mrs. Krebs	TV movie
1983	Sparkling Cyanide	Lucilla Drake	TV movie
1984	Cheers	Dr. Hester Crane	Episode: "Diane Meets Mom"
1986	Spenser: For Hire	Emily Garden	Episode: "In a Safe Place"
1986	North and South, Book II	Dorothea Dix	6 episodes
1986	Spearfield's Daughter	Claudine Roux	Miniseries
1990–1992	Coach	Marlene Watkins	2 episodes
1992	Law & Order	Mrs. Barbara Ryder	Episode: "Blood Is Thicker"
1992	Night Court	Louise Cahill	2 episodes
1993	Crossroads	Aunt Dorothy	Episode: "The Nickel Curve"
1994	Homicide: Life on the Street	Lorraine Freeman	Episode: "All Through the House"
1999–2001	The Sopranos	Livia Soprano	21 episodes

=== Theatre ===
Year	Title	Role	Notes
1951	The Taming of the Shrew	Hostess / Curtis	
1953	Love's Labour's Lost	Princess of France	
1953	The Merchant of Venice	Nerissa	
1956	The Good Woman of Setzuan	Mrs. Mi Tzu	
1957	Miss Isobel	Miriam Ackroyd	
1959	Much Ado About Nothing	Ursula	
1962	Tchin-Tchin	Pamela Pew Pickett (understudy)	
1963	Strange Interlude	Nina Leeds	
1966	3 Bags Full	Genevieve	
1966	The Alchemist	Performer	
1966	Yerma	Dolores	
1967	After the Rain	Gertrude Forbes-Cooper	
1968	Cyrano de Bergerac	Roxane's Duenna / Sister Claire	
1968	Forty Carats	Mrs. Latham	
1971	And Miss Reardon Drinks A Little	Ceil Adams	
1971	Mary Stuart	Queen Elizabeth	
1972	Enemies	Tatiana	
1973	The Plough and the Stars	Mrs. Gogan	
1973	Veronica's Room	The Woman (standby)	
1975	The Glass Menagerie	Amanda Wingfield (standby)	
1980	Morning's at Seven	Ida Bolton	
1984	Awake and Sing!	Bessie Berger	
1985	The Octette Bridge Club	Connie	
1988	The Cocktail Hour	Ann	
1989	Love Letters	Melissa Gardner (replacement)	
1993	The White Liars & Black Comedy	Miss Furnival / Sophie, Baroness Lemberg	

== Awards and nominations ==
Year	Organization	Category	Series	Result
1978	Primetime Emmy Awards	Outstanding Supporting Actress in a Drama Series	Lou Grant	Won
1979	Primetime Emmy Awards	Outstanding Supporting Actress in a Drama Series	Lou Grant	Nominated
1980	Primetime Emmy Awards	Outstanding Supporting Actress in a Drama Series	Lou Grant	Won
1981	Primetime Emmy Awards	Outstanding Supporting Actress in a Drama Series	Lou Grant	Won
1982	Primetime Emmy Awards	Outstanding Supporting Actress in a Drama Series	Lou Grant	Won
1994	Tony Awards	Best Actress in a Play	The White Liars & Black Comedy	Nominated
1999	Primetime Emmy Awards	Outstanding Supporting Actress in a Drama Series	The Sopranos	Nominated
1999	Viewers for Quality Television	Best Supporting Actress in a Quality Drama Series	The Sopranos	Nominated
2000	Golden Globe Awards	Best Supporting Actress – Series, Miniseries, or Television Film	The Sopranos	Won
2000	Primetime Emmy Awards	Outstanding Supporting Actress in a Drama Series	The Sopranos	Nominated
2000	Actor Awards	Outstanding Performance by a Female Actor in a Drama Series	The Sopranos	Nominated
2000	Actor Awards	Outstanding Performance by an Ensemble in a Drama Series	The Sopranos	Won
2001	Actor Awards	Outstanding Performance by an Ensemble in a Drama Series	The Sopranos	Nominated
