= Madhya Pradesh School of Drama =

Theatre training institute

- Type: Public
- Established: 8 July 2011
- Affiliations: Government of Madhya Pradesh
- Director: Sanjay Shrivastav (Present)
- Administrative staff: HOD (Acting ) – Alok Chatterjee (2012 -present)
- Location: Bhopal,, Madhya Pradesh, India; 23.2428°N 77.3986°E
- Campus: Urban
- Website: mpsd.co.in

The Madhya Pradesh School of Drama or MPSD, is a theatre training institute situated at Bhopal, India. It is an autonomous organization under Ministry of Culture, Government of India. It was set up in 2011 by the cabinet of Madhya Pradesh.

The drama school established by government of MP for the practice of systematic training, ultra modern aspects of performances, documentation, maintain a museum, research, library works of traditional, classical and modern theater under the guidance of many eminent theater personalities in the country.

== Training methods ==
Comprehensive knowledge of different aspects of theater training and practice which also includes a host of traditional theater forms such as classical theater, folk and tribal traditions particularly famous local theaters of Madhya Pradesh.

== Guest lecturers ==
Several theatre and film personalities visit the Madhya Pradesh School of Drama as guest lecturers for master classes. Indian theatre directors and actors like Raghubir Yadav, Om Puri, Govind Namdev, Atul Tiwari, Piyush Mishra, Uttara Baokar, Alok Chatterjee have conducted Workshops and interactive session at the Drama school.

== See also ==
- Theatre of India
- Bharatendu Academy of Dramatic Arts
- Biju Pattanaik Film and Television Institute of Odisha
- Government Film and Television Institute
- Film and Television Institute of India
- Satyajit Ray Film and Television Institute
- State Institute of Film and Television
- National School of Drama
