= Soldier's Home (film) =

1977 American short film

- Based on: Soldier's Home by Ernest Hemingway
- Written by: Robert Geller
- Directed by: Robert Young
- Starring: Richard Backus; Nancy Marchand; Lane Binkley; Mark La Mura
- Music by: Dick Hyman
- Country of origin: United States
- Original language: English

Production
- Executive producer: Robert Geller
- Producer: David B. Appleton
- Cinematography: Peter Sova
- Editor: Edward Beyer
- Running time: 42 minutes
- Production company: Learning in Focus

Original release
- Network: PBS
- Release: April 25, 1977

Soldier's Home is a 1977 American short film adaptation of the 1925 short story of the same name by Ernest Hemingway which was originally broadcast as part of The American Short Story series on PBS on April 25, 1977. It was directed by Robert Young, adapted by Robert Geller and starred Richard Backus and Nancy Marchand. The musical score is by Dick Hyman.

== Premise ==
Soldier's Home tells the story of Harold Krebs, who returns from World War I to his home town, and finds challenges in re-entering society.

== Cast ==
- Harold Krebs - Richard Backus
- Mrs. Krebs - Nancy Marchand
- Roselle - Lane Binkley
- Kenner - Mark La Mura
