= Andher Nagari =

Play by Bhartendu Harishchandra

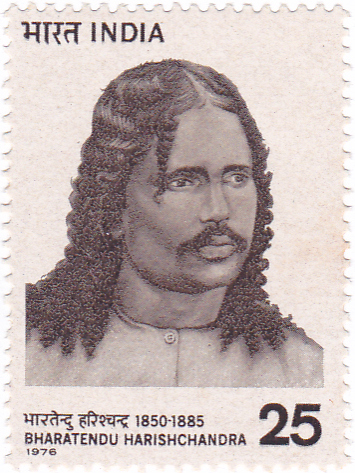
Bhartendu Ji, the author of the play Andheri Nagari on the 1976 postage stamp of India

Andher Nagri is a six-act play written by Indian Hindi writer Bhartendu Harishchandra in 1881. It satirizes autocratic government by an incompetent ruler. Bhartendu composed it in a single day for the Hindu National Theatre in Banaras. It is considered one of the foundational text of modern Hindi drama.

== Story ==
This play is divided into 6 acts.

In the first act, a Mahanta (monk) sends two of his disciples, Govardhan Das and Narayan Das to a nearby town to beg for alms. He warns them about the consequences of greed.

The second act, has a view of the city market where everything is being sold cheap and same price. Govardhan Das is delighted to see this.

In the third act, the two disciples return to the Mahant. Narayan Das brings nothing while Govardhan Das brings large amount of sweets. The Mahant becomes concerned that in this city the virtuous and the demerit get the same treatment and suggests to leave the city immediately. Narayan Das agrees while Govardhan Das stays in the greed of cheap food.

The fourth act, depicts the court and justice of the king Chaupat (Fallen) of Andher Nagari (Dark City). The king listens to complaint of someone's goat getting buried under a merchant's wall when it falls down. The merchant puts the blame on the mason, who puts the blame on the water carrier who mixed the concrete with too much water, the water carrier blames the butcher who made his sheepskin water bag too big, the butcher blames the shepherd who sold him a big sheep for cheap, the shepherd says that during the sale of the sheep he got distracted by the procession of the police chief, and the king sentences the police chief to death for his ride being too distracting resulting in death of a goat.

In the fifth act, Govardhan Das, who gets fat from eating sweets, is caught by four soldiers and taken to the gallows. He is told it is because a goat died, and someone needs to be hanged for the sake of justice. He is confused but eventually finds out that while trying to hang the police chief the noose was repeatedly coming out of his thin neck, because of which the king ordered to hang a fat person in his place.

In the sixth act, preparations are complete to hang Govardhan Das in the crematorium. At this time his Guru Mahanta comes over and whispers something in his ear. After this, both the guru and disciple show their haste to climb the gallows. The king gets curious to know why. He is told that the person who is going to be hanged at this auspicious moment will directly go to heaven. Hearing this he wants to take that opportunity for himself and orders himself to be hanged. In this way the unjust and foolish ways of the king result in his own downfall.

== Characters ==
- Mahant – a monk
- Govardhan Das – Mahant's greedy disciple
- Narayan Das – the second disciple of the Mahant
- kebabwala - kebab seller
- Ghasiram : gram seller
- Narangiwali – orange seller
- confectioner – sweet seller
- Kuzdin – vegetable seller
- Mughal – seller of nuts and fruits
- Pachakwala – Churan seller
- fish seller
- Jaatwala – Brahmin
- merchant
- Raja – quadruple king
- Mantri – Minister of Chaupat Raja
- gardener
- Two servants, two servants of the king
- complainant – one who seeks justice from the king
- Kallu – the bania whose wall collapsed and killed the complainant's goat
- Artisan – Wall maker of Kallu Baniya
- Chunewala – a lime maker
- Bhishti – one who wets lime for building walls
- Kasai – the maker of masks for Bhishti
- Shepherd – one who sells sheep to the butcher
- police officer
- Four Sipahis – The King's Soldiers

== In popular culture ==
The play has been retold through a graphic novel published by Amar Chitra Katha .

== See also ==
- Satya Harishchandra (1965 Kannada film)
