= Agarkhed =

- village
- Location in Karnataka, India Agarkhed (India)
- Coordinates: 17.17°N 75.96°E
- Country: India
- State: Karnataka
- District: Bijapur
- Talukas: Indi

Population (2001)
  - Total: 5,667

Languages
  - Official: Kannada
- Time zone: UTC+5:30 (IST)

Agarkhed is a village in the southern state of Karnataka, India. It is located in the Indi taluk of Bijapur district in Karnataka.

== Demographics ==
As of 2001 India census, Agarkhed had a population of 5667 with 2907 males and 2760 females.

== History ==
Agarkhed was owned by the Adya Jahagirdar family. This has been documented in the Adya Vamsha Pradeepa.

== See also ==
- Bijapur
- Districts of Karnataka
