= Adya Rangacharya =

Indian writer (1904–1984)

- Born: R. V. Jagirdar; 26 September 1904; Agarkhed, Bijapur district, Karnataka
- Died: 17 October 1984 (aged 79); Bangalore, Karnataka, India
- Occupations: Poet, novelist, playwright, translator, actor, critic, scholar
- Spouse: Sharada Adya
- Children: Usha Desai; Shashi Deshpande
- Writing career
- Pen name: Sriranga or Shriranga
- Language: Kannada
- Notable awards: Sangeet Natak Akademi Award (1967); Sahitya Akademi Award (1971); Padma Bhushan (1972)

Adya Rangacharya (26 September 1904 – 17 October 1984), known as R.V. Jagirdar till 1948, later popularly known by his pen name Sriranga, was an Indian Kannada writer, actor and scholar, and a member of the Adya Jahagirdar family. He was awarded the Sangeet Natak Akademi Fellowship in 1967 and the Sahitya Akademi Award for literature in 1971 for Kalidasa, a literary criticism in Kannada.

Rangacharya has been honoured with the Padma Bhushan third highest Indian civilian award for his contributions to the literature and education in 1972 by the Government of India.

== Life ==
Adya Rangacharya birth name was R. V. Jagirdar and was born in Agarkhed, Bijapur district. He has his education at Bombay and London Universities. His writings made him a trend-setter among Kannada and Indian writers. His works include twelve novels and a number of scholarly books on the theatre, on Sanskrit drama and the Bhagavadgita; but it was as a dramatist that he made his mark (47 full-length and 68 one-act plays). He is known for his English translation of the classic work on Indian classical theatre, the Natyasastra

== Works ==
Rangacharya's works include twelve novels and a number of scholarly books on the Theatre, on Sanskrit drama and the Bhagavadgita. He also wrote 71 plays and acted in 47. Besides a translation of Natyasastra, his other works in English include Drama in Sanskrit Literature, Indian Theatre, Introduction to Bharata's Natyasastra, and Introduction to the Comparative Philosophy and Indo-Aryan Languages. He use the pseudonym Sriranga when writing most of his plays and literary work.

His works in English are:

- Bharata, Muni, and Śrīraṅga. The Nāṭyaśāstra: English Translation with Critical Notes. New Delhi: Munshiram Manoharlal Publishers, 1996.
- Drama in Sanskrit Literature, and Introduction to the Comparative Philosophy and Indo-Aryan Languages.
- Rangacharya, Adya. Introduction to Bharata's Nātya-Śāstra. Bombay: Popular Prakashan, 1966.
- Rangacharya, Adya. The Indian Theatre. New Delhi: National Book Trust, India, 1971.
- Śrīraṅga, . Drama in Sanskrit Literature. Bombay: Popular Prakashan, 1967 (2nd ed.)
- Śrīraṅga, . The Quest for Wisdom, Thoughts on the Bhagawadgita. Bombay: Popular Prakashan, 1993. (translation of two Kannada works Gītagāmbhīrya and Gītādarpaṇa

Among his works translated into English are

- Rangacharya, Adya, (transl. by G S. Amur).Listen Janamejaya and Other Plays. New Delhi: Sahitya Akademi, 2005.
- Śrīraṅga, (transl. by Shashi Deshpande) Opening Scene: Early Memoirs of a Dramatist and a Play. New Delhi: Penguin Books, 2006.
- Rangacharya, Adya, (transl. by Usha Desai). Shadows in the Dark: Four Plays. Bangalore, India: Unisun Publications, 2007.
- Sriranga, . These Tombs Alone Remain: A Novel Bangalore: Shriranga Saraswat Prakashana, 1959.
