= Andorra (play) =

Play by Max Frisch

1961 p/b edition (publ. Suhrkamp Verlag)

Andorra is a play written by the Swiss dramatist Max Frisch in 1961. The original text came from a prose sketch Frisch had written in his diary titled Der andorranische Jude (The Andorran Jew). The Andorra in Frisch's play is fictional and not intended to be a representation of the real Andorra located between France and Spain. Frisch has stated that the title Andorra had only been intended as a working title but later liked using the term "Andorrans" so much he kept it.

In Germany, Andorra remains one of the best known of Frisch's plays.

== Plot ==
Andri is a young man who has been raised by the Teacher (der Lehrer) and the Mother (die Mutter) as their Jewish adopted son alongside their daughter Barblin; the Teacher claims to have rescued Andri from the antisemitic Blacks (die Schwarzen) in the neighbouring country. Apart from Andri and Barblin, the other characters are referred to by their occupations or roles (though most do have names). After some of twelve scenes (which are called Bilder, meaning "pictures"), characters come forth to a witness box and talk about Andri's death in the past tense (each additional scene is denoted Vordergrund, which means "foreground"). In this way, information about Andri's parentage and fate is gradually revealed. Each townsperson attempts to rationalise their involvement in Andri's death; only the Priest (der Pater) is willing to accept any guilt. Every character alive at the end of the play makes such a statement, except for Barblin, the Mother, and the non-speaking characters.

At the beginning of the play, Andri is engaged to Barblin. The Soldier (der Soldat) is interested in her sexually, but she strongly dislikes him. The townspeople hold antisemitic views, and there are rumours of a coming invasion by the Blacks. The Teacher sells land to the Landlord (der Wirt) so that he can pay the Carpenter (der Tischler) to take on Andri as an apprentice. However, Andri is later dismissed from his apprenticeship when the Carpenter thinks that Andri has made a poor-quality chair, which was in fact made by the Journeyman (der Geselle), who does not admit to it. The Carpenter instead employs Andri as a salesman.

The Doctor (der Doktor) makes antisemitic remarks in front of Andri, unaware that Andri believes that he is Jewish. Andri tells the Teacher and the Mother that he and Barblin want to marry, and that they have been in love since childhood. The Teacher forbids the marriage without giving a reason; Andri thinks that it is because he is Jewish. The Teacher says (in an aside) that Andri is in fact his biological son. He tries to tell Andri this, but Andri has embraced his Jewishness and refuses to listen. At the same time, the Soldier rapes Barblin; Andri discovers this fact later.

The Mother, believing Andri to be a Jew, asks the Priest to speak to Andri to help him accept his Jewishness. The Señora (die Senora) then arrives in town; the townspeople are prejudiced against her because she is a foreigner. She helps Andri after he is assaulted by the Soldier. It is revealed that the Señora is Andri's real mother, but she leaves the town without telling Andri this (she gives Andri a ring). The Mother learns the truth about Andri's parentage, and the Teacher asks the Priest to explain the truth to Andri. Andri is not at all receptive and believes his fate to be sealed. The Señora is killed after a stone is thrown at her, and the Landlord claims that Andri is responsible (it is heavily implied that the Landlord killed her).

The Blacks invade, and the Soldier defects and joins them. The townspeople search for Andri, believing him to be a murderer; Andri hides outside, where the Teacher tries to persuade him of the truth, and then inside the Teacher's house with Barblin. Andri confronts Barblin about her relationship with the Soldier, and tells her to kiss him; he is not acting rationally at this point. The Soldier enters the house and arrests Andri.

The Blacks conduct a "Jew-Show" (die Judenschau) in the town square, led by the "Jew-Inspector" (der Judenschauer), to find the Señora's killer. This is shown to be a show trial; despite Barblin and the Mother's attempts to disrupt the process, the other townspeople co-operate. Andri does not defend himself, and is killed by soldiers, who are impelled to cut off his finger to take the Señora's ring. Afterwards, the Teacher hangs himself. Barblin has her head shaved (earlier in the play, the Blacks are rumoured to do this to the wives of Jews) and goes mad. She does not fully accept that Andri has died, and leaves his shoes on the stage, stopping people from touching them.

== Dramatic techniques ==
Andorra is an example of epic theatre (as opposed to classical theatre), which was popularised by Bertolt Brecht in the early 20th century. Epic theatre aims to activate the audience into thinking about the important questions and ideas within the play so that he or she can form their own rational opinion for themselves after having been an active, critical observer.

Frisch uses the Verfremdungseffekt (distancing effect) throughout the play, with the aim of distancing the audience from the action so that they can think about the themes of the play rather than getting immersed in the plot. Frisch uses these techniques, as he wanted to create a dramatic situation where a character is mistaken for a Jew when he really wasn't one. All the characters and events are subservient to this central idea.

=== Verfremdungseffekt in Andorra ===
- Most characters (with the exceptions of Andri, Barblin and perhaps The Teacher) are one-dimensional stereotypes devoid of most personality traits, since they are only there to further the plot (for instance The Landlord, who is implied to throw the stone that kills the Señora), or to demonstrate examples of prejudice (for example The Carpenter forces Andri to work with money).

Their personality is otherwise completely irrelevant to the plot, and it would only divert the audience's attention from what is important if these characters had a personality.

- Most characters do not even have a name and are instead just portrayed as representatives of a job (e.g. The Landlord). Only certain traits are displayed; those that are relevant to the theme of the plot, such as the narrow-mindedness of The Doctor.
- Andorra is not divided up into scenes, as in classical theatre, rather in twelve Bilder ("pictures") of varying length and structure.
- Between the pictures are Vordergrundszenen (foreground scenes), where one character stands in a so-called "witness box" and makes a so-called "confession" to an imaginary court (though all apart from The Priest claim to be innocent). These scenes break up the action and the tension, thereby giving the audience time to reflect.
- Tension in the play is dissipated since the two biggest shocks are given away right at the beginning - The Landlord says in his "confession" that Andri is really The Teacher's son, and it is repeatedly made clear that something bad happens to Andri.

== Themes ==
The play was written fifteen years after the end of World War II and is more of a study of cultural prejudice than a specific reflection on the war. However, it concerns more than just prejudice: many of the characters have something to gain from Andri's being a Jew: the Teacher has been able to present himself as a Good Samaritan, the Soldier can get Barblin, the Carpenter can make money; even the Priest can demonstrate his Christian sympathy for the outsider. The motif of whitewashing, with which the play starts and ends, points to hypocrisy as a central theme.

Another recurring theme is people's shoes, and how they represent the roles assigned to their wearers. This idea is likely to have been inspired by the phrase "to put oneself in someone else's shoes", which exists in German as in English. At the end of the play, Andri's shoes are left on the stage; Barblin asks the other characters not to touch them until he comes back, although Andri is dead.

== Production history ==
In 1964, Andorra was translated and adapted for an English language audience by Michael Bullock and produced by the Royal National Theatre of Great Britain, directed by Lindsay Anderson. In 2001, a revival of the play was co-produced by the Young Vic Theatre and the Royal National Theatre Studio, directed by Gregory Thompson and performed at the Young Vic.
