= The White Liars =

Play written by Peter Shaffer

- Programme 1968 Lyric Theatre production
- Written by: Peter Shaffer
- Characters: Sophie, Baroness Lemberg; Frank; Tom
- Original language: English
- Genre: Drama

Premiere
- Date premiered: 1967
- Place premiered: Ethel Barrymore Theatre, New York City

The White Liars is a one-act play by Peter Shaffer, first performed in 1967 and originally titled White Lies.

It is often performed with another of Shaffer's one-act plays, Black Comedy, to form the double-bill of The White Liars and Black Comedy.

The White Liars revolves around Sophie Lemberg, an eccentric and disillusioned fortune teller (who imagines herself to be a baroness of the Holy Roman Empire) living in a decaying seaside resort, and the two young men—Tom, the lead singer in a rock band, and Frank, his business manager—who consult her. It soon becomes clear that their lives are much stranger than the fiction Sophie tries to create in her magic ball.

== Development ==
Shaffer wrote White Lies to precede the 1967 Broadway production of his farce Black Comedy, presented by Alexander H. Cohen at the Ethel Barrymore Theatre. But Shaffer was dissatisfied with the piece. As he put it in his preface to his 1982 Collected Plays, "The dramatic pulse was too low, and the work came out a little mechanically."

When the double bill was subsequently produced in London at the Lyric Theatre directed by Peter Wood, Shaffer rewrote the play extensively and retitled it The White Liars. Shaffer was happier with this version, but as he put it, "it was marred by an offstage tape representing the voice of Sophie's Greek lover."

It was not until the play's third incarnation in 1976 at the Shaw Theatre in London, directed by Paul Giovanni, that Shaffer was satisfied with it. Sophie's Greek lover was written out of the story entirely, and Tom and Frank underwent extreme changes from their original characters.

== Production history ==
For the production history of The White Liars, see the production history for Black Comedy.
