= Hello Out There! =

1941 play by William Saroyan, and 1950 film

- Written by: William Saroyan
- Original language: English
- Genre: one-act play
- Setting: A small jail in Texas

Premiere
- Date premiered: September 10, 1941
- Place premiered: Lobero Theatre in Santa Barbara, California

Hello Out There! is a one-act play by the Armenian-American playwright William Saroyan written early in August 1941.

== Plot ==
The play is set in a small Texas jail. There are two major characters, Photo-Finish and Emily, whom Saroyan refers to simply as "A Young Man" and "A Girl". Photo-Finish is a down on his luck gambler and ends up in jail in a hole-in-the-wall town as a result of a married harlot crying rape when he refused to pay her after coming over to her house.

There he meets Emily, an unhappy cook. When they meet, it is love at first sight. Emily and Photo-Finish fall in love and make plans to go to San Francisco, but their plans are crushed when the men looking for Photo-Finish find him and kill him.

== Production history ==
The play was first performed in 1941 at the Lobero Theatre in Santa Barbara, California as the curtain raiser to a revival of George Bernard Shaw's The Devil's Disciple, and was first performed on Broadway in 1942. The Broadway production starred Eddie Dowling and Julie Haydon. Al Pacino played the Young Man in a performance in 1963 that marked his first appearance on stage in New York City.

== Film adaptation ==
In 1950, the play was adapted into a short film, directed by James Whale and produced by millionaire Huntington Hartford. It starred Harry Morgan, Marjorie Steele (Hartford's then-wife), Lee Patrick, and Ray Teal. The film, intended to be one episode in an anthology film in the style of similar films such as W. Somerset Maugham's Quartet (1948), was never released. Hello Out There was Whale's last film.

== Opera ==
In 1953, composer Jack Beeson composed a one-act chamber opera based on the play.

In 1971, the Latvian composer Imants Kalniņš composed a one-act rock opera "Ei, jūs tur!" based on the play, with a libretto by his brother, Viktors Kalniņš (Viks). This became the first rock opera in the Soviet Union.
