= National School of Drama =

Theatre training institute in India

- Type: Public
- Established: 1959; 67 years ago
- Parent institution: Sangeet Natak Akademi
- Chairperson: Paresh Rawal
- Director: Chittaranjan Tripathy
- Location: New Delhi, National Capital Territory of Delhi, India; 28°37′30.17″N 77°14′2.72″E
- Website: www.nsd.gov.in

National School of Drama (NSD) is a drama school situated at New Delhi, India. It is an autonomous organization under Ministry of Culture, Government of India. It was set up in 1959 by the Sangeet Natak Akademi and became an independent school in 1975. In 2005, it was granted deemed university status, but in 2011 it was revoked. Paresh Rawal is the current Chairperson & Chittaranjan Tripathy currently serves as Director of National School of Drama (NSD).

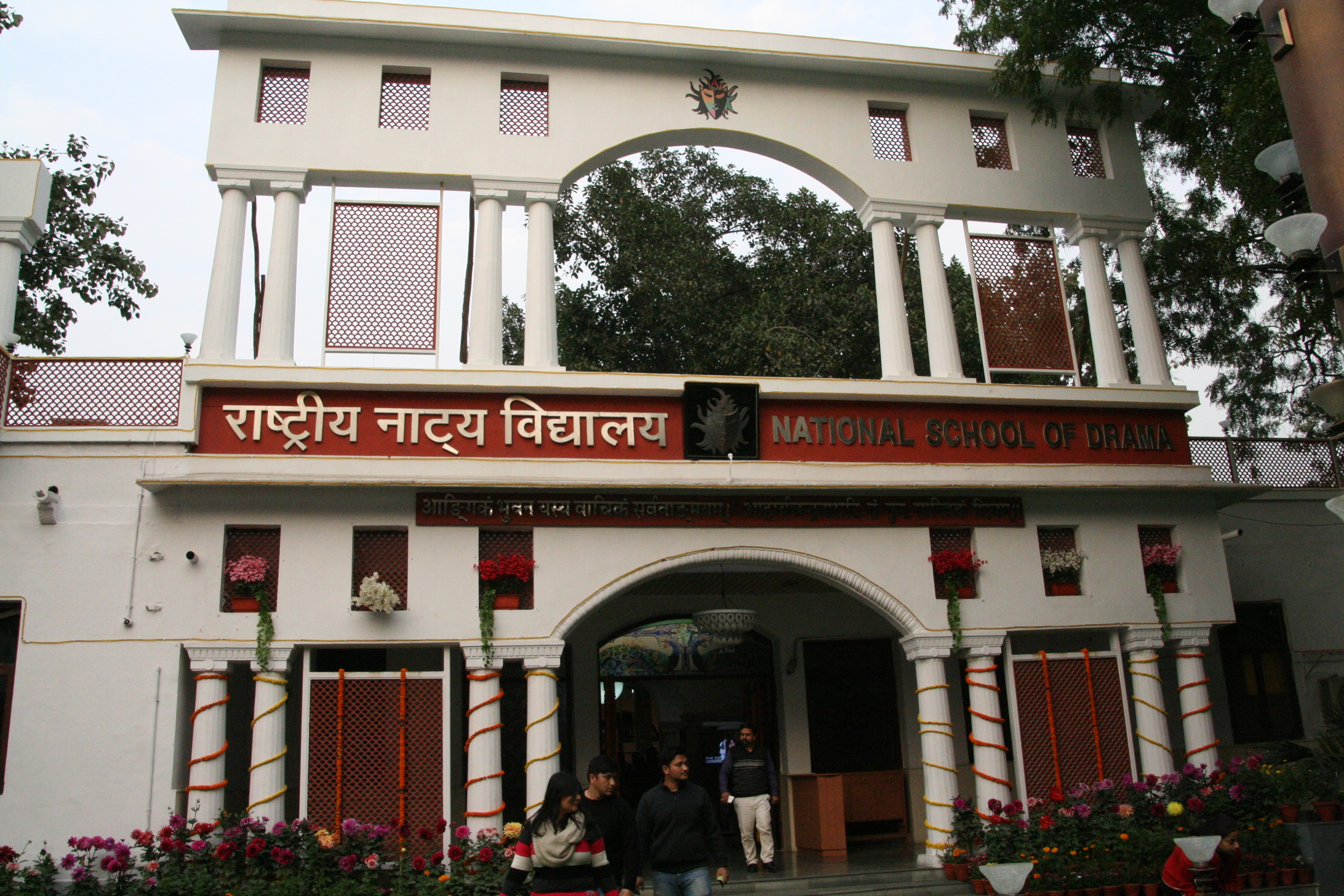
National School of Drama in Mandi House

== History ==
The origins of the school can be traced back to a seminar in 1954, where the idea of a Central institution for theatre was mooted, subsequently, a draft scheme was prepared in 1955, and the Sangeet Natak Akademi, which had Jawaharlal Nehru as its president, started drawing plans for the institution. Meanwhile, elsewhere in Delhi, Bharatiya Natya Sangh (BNS) with assistance from UNESCO, independently established the Asian Theatre Institute (ATI) on 20 January 1958, and in July 1958, ATI was taken over by the Sangeet Natak Akademi (SNA), India's National Academy of Music, dance and drama of Government of India.

In the following year, the government merged it with the newly founded school, and thus NSD was established in April 1959 under the auspices of Sangeet Natak Akademi. Initially, the school was situated at Nizamuddin West and was called National School of Drama and Asian Theatre Institute, whose first batch passed out in 1961. During his tenure as the director of the institution, Ebrahim Alkazi (1962–1977), not only overhauled the syllabus, but also had the students dig and build platforms for a theatre in the backyard of a rented Kailash Colony house, where NSD had moved. Later when it moved to its present location, he also designed two theatres for NSD, including a 200-seat studio theatre, and the open-air Meghdoot theatre, under a banyan tree.

In 1975 it became an autonomous organization, under the erstwhile Ministry of Education and Ministry of Culture, Department of Culture, with the name 'National School of Drama' and relocated in May 1975, to its present premises at Bahawalpur House, the residence of Bahawalpur a former princely state. However, the place is generally known by adjacent (now demolished) Mandi House, the former residence of Raja of erstwhile Mandi princely state. In 1999, the school organized its first National Theatre Festival, Bharat Rang Mahotsav, generally held during the second week of January each year.

In 2008, the institution celebrated its golden jubilee at its annual theatre festival, Bharat Rang Mahotsav, with a gathering of its alumni from all over the country, the festival's satellite edition in Mumbai showcased plays of NSD graduates, including Ratan Thiyam's Prologue, Bansi Kaul (Aranyadhipati Tantiya), Neelam Mansingh Chowdhury (The Suit), Sanjay Upadhyay (Harsingar), Baharul Islam (Akash), Mohan Maharishi (Dear Bapu) and M. K. Raina (Stay Yet Awhile). Waman Kendre was appointed as Director the school in 2013. He will serve a five-year term. He has done post-graduate with research in folk theatre of Kerala from NSD. He belongs to the nomadic Vanjari tribal community of Marathwada and was one of the leading lights of the Dalit theatre movement in Maharashtra in the late 1970s. As of 10 September 2020 Paresh Rawal, has been appointed as the Chairman of the National School of Drama. On 6 October 2023, Chittaranjan Tripathy became the new Director of NSD. He is a prominent theater and film actor, director, screen writer and music composer both in Hindi and Odia film industry.

=== Deemed university status ===
On 16 March 2005, the Government of India granted the NSD the status of deemed university. However, in 2010 the NSD Society asked for the deemed university status to be revoked since "[it] could undermine the professional training, autonomy, and flexibility required in the creative fields such as theatre." Thus, in October 2011, the status was revoked on request of NSD.

== Performing wings ==
=== Repertory company ===
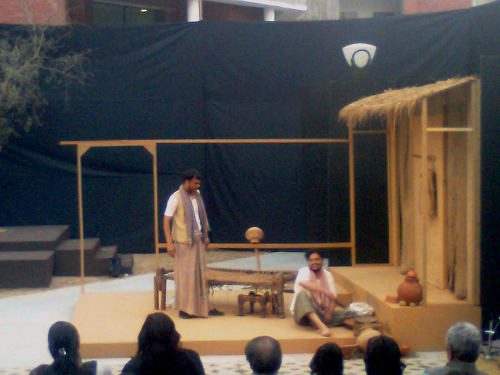
Play by the NSD at the Anugoonj, 2011 (cultural festival of the GGSIPU, Delhi)

The professional performing wing of NSD, the National School of Drama Repertory Company was set up in 1964, with an aim to promote professional theatre in India. Its first head was Om Shivpuri, followed by Manohar Singh, Ram Gopal Bajaj (Acting Chief), J.N. Kaushal (Acting Chief), Anuradha Kapur (Acting Chief), and Suresh Sharma, Sagar Kamble, Atul Singhai (Animation chief).

Today, the Repertory Company has staged over 120 plays based on the works of about 70 playwrights and featuring around 50 directors in several countries, and various cities across the nation, and has its own festival every year called the Annual Repertory Company Summer Festival, in which it performs new and past plays. In 2004, the repertory celebrated its 40th anniversary with a theatre festival in New Delhi.

=== Sanskaar Rang Toli ===
In 1989 NSD established the Theatre-in-Education Company (TIE), called Sanskaar Rang Toli, which coaches children aged 8 to 16 years. The company regularly performs plays for school and adult audiences alike, and has its own yearly theatre festivals, Jashn-e-Bachpan and Bal Sangam.

== Performing spaces ==
The school has three auditoria within the campus:

- Abhimanch Auditorium
- Sammukh Auditorium
- Bahumukh Auditorium

It also has a studio theatre and minor performances spaces used on special occasions, like the Bharat Rangmahotsav.

== Regional centres ==
In a bid to decentralize its activities, NSD opened Regional Resource Centres (RRC) across India, the first of which was opened at Bengaluru in 1994. A new centre was established in Varanasi. After the Reorganization of Andhra Pradesh State the "National Institute of Drama (NID)" was sanctioned for the Rajahmundry but is still pending to be fulfilled.

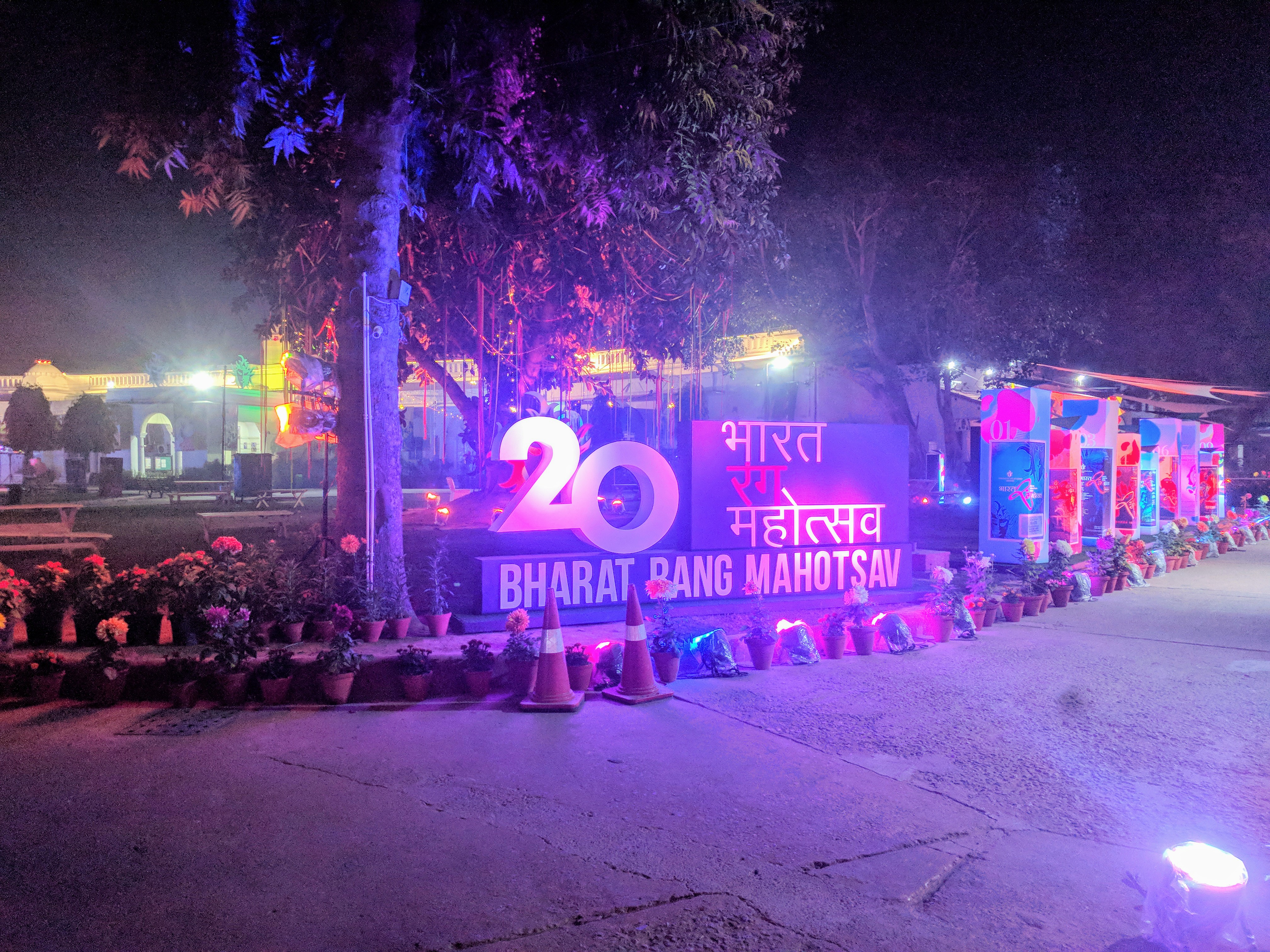
Rang Mahotsav festival at NSD

In November 2025, NSD inaugurated its 6th permanent center in Mumbai, with notable alumni and theatre personalities in attendance. The program featured theatre veterans, including Prof. Waman Kendre and Prof. Ram Gopal Bajaj. The centre aims to bring world-class theatre training to the city and to serve as a hub for aspiring actors and theatre professionals. The Mumbai center offers a One-Year Acting Programme, part-time certificate and weekend certificate courses in dramatic arts.

== Bharat Rang Mahotsav ==
Bharat Rang Mahotsav, or the National Theatre Festival, established in 1999, is the annual theatre festival of National School of Drama (NSD), held in New Delhi, today it is acknowledged as the largest theatre festival of Asia/World, dedicated solely to theatre. The school also organizes a festival showcasing tribal traditions, the Adirang Mahotsav.

=== BRM@25 ===
NSD concluded its BRM@25, Silver Jubilee edition in February 2025. The festival was celebrated in India, Sri Lanka and Nepal, with over 500 performances by recognised industry stalwarts, global theatre practitioners and students of the drama school.

Bollywood actor and NSD alumni Rajpal Yadav was nominated as the Rang Doot for BRM@25.

There were masterclasses, seminars and talks with notable alumni of the school and industry professionals.

Students of the Short Term courses also performed at the festival, with 10 - 30 minutes performances directed by faculty and alumni of the institute.

== Extension programme ==
Extension programmes, through which NSD staff and alumni conduct workshops in various parts of the nation, were established in 1978. Workshops and programmes for adults and children have since been conducted throughout the country, and in Nepal, Sikkim, Ladakh, and Bhutan. Since its inception in 1980, the Traditional Theatrical Project has regularly allowed creative contact between traditional and contemporary theatre performers. Along with providing an introduction to theatre, these programmes aim to help participants develop their personalities and broaden their emotional horizons.

=== Extension centers ===
- Sikkim Center
- Bengaluru Center
- TIE Wings Tripura
- Varanasi Center

==== Northeast Extension Programme ====
The National School of Drama's Extension Programme connects the school in Delhi to other regional theatres around the country. The school has been imparting training and creating plays with theatre practitioners all throughout the country through a series of well-planned theatrical workshops that take into account the individual demands of each location. These courses instruct those who cannot afford to spend three years at NSD and those who have been practising theatre for a long time.

The school also builds contact with a significant number of theatrical groups and organizations that are performing good work in the regions through collaborative projects through this programme.

NSD has recently arranged a series of theatre workshops in the Northeastern States as part of its Extension Programme. The workshops followed a three-step programme: the first was to pique all participants' interest in the complexities of the theatre experience - performance and transference; the second was to impart training in the area; and the third was to assist and guide them in preparing productions based on the received training. Once the productions were completed, participants were given the opportunity to present ten shows in various sections of the region in order to build self-confidence, a variety of experience, and audience engagement. Finally, the School decided to provide a forum to present these creations, which is how the Poorvottar Natya Samaroh was born.

The first Poorvottar Natya Samaroh took place in Guwahati in 2007, followed by the second in Gangtok, Sikkim, in 2008. The plays in the Poorvottar Natya Samaroh covered a wide range of topics, including romance, social issues such as caste and gender, exploitation in a feudal system, survival and hope in a conflict-torn societal milieu, philosophical ideas, and resistance.

== Short term courses ==
In 2024, NSD resumed conducting short term courses in acting and theatre direction with introduction of a 3 month certification course at its Delhi campus.

The course aims to further propagate interest in theatre, while giving opportunities to theatre professionals and aspirants alike, to develop and hone their craft with the best facilities available at the drama school. The course operates as of today in four variants—Basic, Advanced, Weekend, and Senior Citizens—fostering the spirit that "Theatre is for everyone." Starting May 26, 2025, a new "Super Advanced" short-term course at NSD is open to anyone and everyone who has completed the Advanced course.

== Publications ==
Major books and journals of NSD include:

- Theatre India
- Rang Prasang
- Raj Bhasha Munjusha (19th edition)
- Raj Bhasha Munjusha (20th edition)
- Rang Manch

== Notable alumni ==
Several NSD alumni have achieved national recognition for their work on stage, television and film. The following is a partial listing as provided by the school's website.

Name	Year	
Om Shivpuri	1963	
Sudha Shivpuri	1963	
Sai Paranjpye	1963	
V K Sharma	1972	
Om Puri	1973	
Naseeruddin Shah	1973	
Rohini Hattangadi	1974	
Ratan Thiyam	1974	
Rajesh Vivek	1974	
Raj Babbar	1975	
Bijay Mohanty	1975	
Pankaj Kapur	1976	
Annu Kapoor	1976	
Robin Das	1976	
K. K. Raina	1976	
Virendra Razdan	1977	
Raghubir Yadav	1977	
Govind Namdev	1977	
Satish Kaushik	1978	
Anupam Kher	1978	
Anang Desai	1978	
Suresh Bhardwaj
Tripurari Sharma	1979	
Alok Nath
Neena Gupta
1980
1980	Ratna Pathak	1981
Deepa Sahi		1981
Himani Bhatt Shivpuri	1982	
Savita Prabhune	1983	
Seema Biswas	1984	
Piyush Mishra	1986	
Suresh Sharma	1986	
Vibha Chibber	1986	
Raghubir Yadav	1986	
Irrfan Khan	1987	
Bharti Sharma	1987	
Mita Vashisht	1987	
Vineet Kumar	1989	
Sanjay Mishra	1989	
Nirmal Pandey	1989	
Navneet Nishan	1989	
Tigmanshu Dhulia	1989	
Kenneth Desai	1989	
Sitaram Panchal	1989	
Rajesh Sharma	1990	
Ashish Vidyarthi	1990	
Anup Soni	1993	
Rajesh Tailang	1993	
Zakir Hussain (actor)	1993	
Harish Khanna (actor)	1993	
Ashutosh Rana	1994	
Abhay Kulkarni	1994	
Rajpal Yadav	1994	
Kumud Mishra	1994	
Mukesh Tiwari	1994	
Yashpal Sharma	1994	
Atul Kulkarni	1995	
Swanand Kirkire	1996	
Sunita Rajwar	1997	
Nawazuddin Siddiqui	1999	
Subrat Dutta	1999	
Chittaranjan Tripathy	1999	
Gopal Datt	1999	
Neeraj Sood	1999	
Shyam Pathak	2001	
Chinmay Mandlekar	2001	
Pankaj Tripathi	2004	
Ishtiyak Khan	2004	
Mohammed Zeeshan Ayyub	2007	
Dinesh Yadav	2007	
Tushar Pandey	2009	
Durgesh Kumar	2009	
Boloram Das	2009	
Bhupendra Jadawat	2017	
Indira Tiwari	2018	

== Chairpersons of NSD ==
Chairpersons of NSD
- Dr. K.V. Rajamannar – 1959-61
- Maharaja Shri Chamaraja Wadiyar Bahadur – 1961-65
- Indira Gandhi – 1965-72
- K.P.S. Menon – 1976-Feb.1978
- Kamaladevi Chattopadhyay – March–Nov.1978
- L. M. Singhvi – Nov. 1978–82
- Shanta Gandhi – 1982–84
- Suresh Awasthi – 1984–86
- Vijaya F. Mehta – 1988–92
- P.C. Joshi – 1992–96
- Chandrashekhara Kambara – 1996-Nov.2000
- Anupam Kher – 2001-04
- Amal Allana – May 2005-13
- Ratan Thiyam – 2013-17
- Arjun Deo Charan – 2017-2020
- Paresh Rawal – Sept.2020-

== Notable faculty ==
- Ram Gopal Bajaj
- Sheila Bhatia
- B. M. Shah
- Mohan Upreti
- Tripurari Sharma

== Directors of NSD ==
NSD has had fourteen directors since its establishment in 1959:

Director	Took office	Left office
Satu Sen	1959	1961
Ebrahim Alkazi	1962	1977
B. V. Karanth	1977	1982
B. M. Shah	1982	1984
Mohan Maharishi	1984	1986
Ratan Thiyam	1987	1988
Kirti Jain	1988	1995
Ram Gopal Bajaj	1995	Sept 2001
Devendra Raj Ankur	2001	3 July 2007
Anuradha Kapur	July 2007	July 2013
Waman Kendre	August 2013	26 September 2018
Chittaranjan Tripathy	6 October 2023	

== See also ==
- Theatre of India
- Ebrahim Alkazi
- Ninasam
- Bharatendu Academy of Dramatic Arts
- Biju Pattanaik Film and Television Institute of Odisha
- Government Film and Television Institute
- Film and Television Institute of India
- Satyajit Ray Film and Television Institute
- State Institute of Film and Television
- Madhya Pradesh School of Drama
- Kalabhavan
