= Black Comedy (play) =

Comedy performed in England

- Marquee for the original Broadway production at the Ethel Barrymore Theatre, 1967
- Original language: English
- Written by: Peter Shaffer
- Genre: Farce
- Setting: 9:30 on a Sunday night Mid 1960s South Kensington, London; Brindsley Miller's flat

Premiere
- Date: 1965
- Place: National Theatre; Chichester, England

Black Comedy is a one-act farce by Peter Shaffer, first performed in 1965. The premise of the piece is that light and dark are transposed, so that when the stage is lit the cast are supposed to be in darkness and only when the stage is dark are they supposed to be able to see each other and their surroundings.

In the play, a young sculptor and his fiancée have borrowed some expensive antique furniture from a neighbour's flat without his permission to impress an elderly millionaire art collector. When the power fails, the neighbour returns early, other people also arrive unexpectedly, and matters descend into near-chaos.

== Background and first production ==
In the early spring of 1965, Kenneth Tynan, dramaturge of the National Theatre, commissioned Shaffer to write a one-act play to accompany a production of Miss Julie starring Maggie Smith and Albert Finney. Shaffer later wrote in the introduction to his 1982 Collected Plays:

Without much conviction, but with the sort of energy which Tynan always elicited from me, I described my idea of a party given in a London flat, played in Chinese darkness – full light – because of a power failure in the building. We would watch the guests behave in a situation of increasing chaos, but they would of course remain throughout quite unable to see one another. Ever one to appreciate a theatrical idea, Tynan dragged me off instantly to see Laurence Olivier, the director of the National. In vain did I protest that there really was no play, merely a convention, and that anyway I had to travel immediately to New York to write a film script. Olivier simply looked through me with his own Chinese and unseeing eyes, said "It's all going to be thrilling!" and left the room.

Shaffer set about composing the play. To produce a more sustaining dramatic premise than the mere gimmick of inverse lighting, Shaffer devised the notion that one of the characters had a reason to actually keep the others in the dark. It was from this necessity that the idea of the stolen furniture was conceived, and the theme of lies was solidified. Brindsley would keep his guests in the dark – both figuratively and literally.

Tynan later said of the rehearsal process, "This was farce rehearsed in farce conditions." Owing to scheduling difficulties at Chichester, Black Comedy was given very little rehearsal time, and it opened without a single public preview. The play was directed by John Dexter – who had directed Shaffer's previous play The Royal Hunt of the Sun, and later directed Equus – with what Shaffer called "blazing precision." He added that "it was acted with unmatchable brio by Smith and Finney, by Derek Jacobi as an incomparable Brindsley, and by Graham Crowden as a savagely lunatic Colonel Melkett". Smith had previously starred in two of Shaffer's previous plays, The Private Ear and The Public Eye, which were performed as a double bill at the Globe Theatre.

The play is written to be staged under a reversed lighting scheme: the play opens on a darkened stage. A few minutes into the action there is a short circuit, and the stage is illuminated to reveal the characters in a "blackout". On the few occasions when matches, lighters, or torches are lit, the lights grow dimmer.

Black Comedy was first presented at the Chichester Festival Theatre by the National Theatre on 27 July 1965, and subsequently at the Old Vic, London, directed by Dexter with the following cast:

- Brindsley Miller – Derek Jacobi
- Carol Melkett – Louise Purnell
- Miss Furnival – Doris Hare
- Colonel Melkett – Graham Crowden
- Harold Gorringe – Albert Finney
- Schuppanzigh – Paul Curran
- Clea – Maggie Smith
- Georg Bamberger – Michael Byrne

== Synopsis ==
The original 1965 National Theatre cast of Black Comedy. From left: Louise Purnell as Carol Melkett, Albert Finney as Harold Gorringe, Derek Jacobi as Brindsley Miller, Maggie Smith as Clea, and Graham Crowden as Colonel Melkett.

The play begins in complete darkness.

Brindsley Miller, a young sculptor, and his debutante fiancée, Carol Melkett, have stolen some expensive antiques from his neighbour Harold Gorringe, who is away for the weekend, to spruce up Brindsley's apartment to impress Carol's father and a wealthy prospective art buyer named Georg Bamberger. Before the guests arrive, a fuse in the cellar short-circuits, causing a blackout. The stage is instantly illuminated.

As Brindsley and Carol search for matches, the phone rings and Brindsley answers. It is his former mistress Clea, who has just returned from Finland. Brindsley distracts Carol and refuses to see Clea.

Miss Furnival, the occupant of the flat upstairs, enters seeking refuge from her fear of the dark. Miss Furnival is a spinster and lifelong teetotaller. They ring the London Electricity Board, but are told only that an electrician might arrive some time later that night.

Carol's father, Colonel Melkett, arrives. He takes an almost instant dislike to Brindsley and is unimpressed with one of his sculptures – a large work in iron with two prongs.

Harold Gorringe returns from his weekend early. Brindsley quickly pulls Harold into the flat so that he will not go into his own and discover the thievery. In the dark, Harold does not realise that the room is full of his own things. As Carol blindly mixes everyone drinks, Brindsley attempts to silently restore as much of the stolen furniture to Harold's flat as possible.

There is a mix-up as Carol hands out the drinks in the dark, and Miss Furnival is given liquor by mistake. She is hooked after her first taste, and stealthily procures more. Harold discovers Brindsley and Carol's engagement, and is furious at the news. It is obvious that he himself has secret feelings for Brindsley. (It is also implied that Brindsley might also be having an affair with Harold.)

Clea enters unannounced. In the confusion, Brindsley catches hold of her bottom, and instantly recognises it. He manages to retreat with her to the loft, where his desperate pleas that she leave dissolve into passionate kisses. When she refuses to go, he concedes that she can stay in the loft, if she will not come downstairs.

The electrician, a German named Schuppanzigh, arrives to mend the fuse, and everyone excitedly mistakes him for Bamberger. The electrician, with his lit torch, catches sight of the sculpture, and is extremely impressed. Schuppanzigh, who was highly educated in art at Heidelberg, praises Brindsley's work with great eloquence. Just as the statue seems on the verge of being sold for five hundred guineas, they realise who he really is. The group turns on him in indignation, and Schuppanzigh is cast down to the cellar to mend the fuse.

Clea emerges from the loft and discovers Brindsley's engagement. Outraged, she dashes vodka over the startled guests. When Clea reveals herself, Carol is horrified, but is interrupted by Miss Furnival who, completely inebriated, erupts into a drunken tirade, ranting on the terrors of the modern supermarket, calling to her dead father, and prophesying a judgement day when "the heathens in their leather jackets" will be "stricken from their motorcycles." She is led out by a consoling Harold. Carol breaks off the engagement and the Colonel is livid.

When Harold discovers the state of his room, he returns to Brindsley's flat mad with fury. He pulls one of the metal prongs out of the statue and advances on him. The Colonel follows suit, pulling out the other prong, and together they advance on the terrified sculptor.

Finally, Georg Bamberger arrives. This time, the guests mistake the millionaire for the electrician, until Schuppanzigh emerges from the cellar and declares that the fuse is fixed. The startled guests realize that Bamberger has, at long last, arrived, and Brindsley exclaims happily "Everything's all right now! Just in the nick of time!" But just as he says this, Bamberger falls into the open trapdoor. As Harold, Colonel Melkett, and Carol advance on Brindsley and Clea, Schuppanzigh turns on the lights with a great flourish. There is instant darkness.

== Reception ==
Shaffer described the opening night of Black Comedy the performance as "a veritable detonation of human glee", and wrote of an audience member sobbing with laughter and calling out in pain. The reviews were generally good. The Times said of the piece, "It may not be a milestone in the development of English drama, but it is a very funny play". J. C. Trewin in The Illustrated London News thought the piece overlong: "If this were a revue, we might consider ten minutes ample". The reviewer in The Stage concurred that the piece was too long, finding it "for some time clever, surprising, funny, until, fifteen minutes or so before the end Mr Shaffer's invention, and so the impact of the piece, weakens." Claudia Cassidy in the Chicago Tribune also thought the play overlong, but noted that "some of the sight and sound gags are so flawless … that the audience is reduced to jelly". The Tatler's reviewer found the play "one of the funniest farces I can remember seeing". Penelope Gilliatt in The Observer gave the piece a moderate welcome but found it "a blinding idea not very boldly pursued". In The Guardian, Philip Hope-Wallace called it "an uproarious piece of slapstick vaudeville … sometimes a little long, but it comes to a magnificent climax almost worthy of Feydeau". When the first Broadway production opened in 1967, John Chapman wrote in The Daily News, found that the author sustained the comedy from start to finish: "I was sorry indeed when the stage went dark and the farce ended".

== The White Liars ==
Black Comedy is often performed with another Peter Shaffer one-act, The White Liars, to form the double-bill of The White Liars and Black Comedy. The two plays are published together. The White Liars was first performed in 1967 under the title White Lies, with the original Broadway production of Black Comedy. It was billed as a "curtain-raiser" to Black Comedy. Peter Shaffer retitled the play for subsequent productions.

The White Liars is shorter than Black Comedy. It concerns a down-on-her-luck fortune teller living in a decaying seaside resort, and the two young men – Tom, the lead singer in a rock band, and Frank, his business manager – who consult her. It is more serious than its farcical companion piece.

== Revivals ==
=== First Broadway production ===
Black Comedy was first presented in New York with White Lies at the Ethel Barrymore Theater by Alexander H. Cohen directed by Dexter with the following cast:

White Lies:

- Sophie, Baroness Lemberg – Geraldine Page
- Frank – Donald Madden
- Tom – Michael Crawford

Black Comedy:

- Brindsley Miller – Michael Crawford
- Carol Melkett – Lynn Redgrave
- Miss Furnival – Camila Ashland
- Colonel Melkett – Peter Bull
- Harold Gorringe – Donald Madden
- Schuppanzigh – Pierre Epstein
- Clea – Geraldine Page
- Georg Bamberger – Michael Miller

The production previewed from 31 January 1967, and opened on 12 February 1967. It closed on 2 December 1967, after a total of 14 previews and 337 performances.

=== 1968 London production ===
Black Comedy and White Lies, retitled The White Liars, were presented at the Lyric Theatre, London, under the title The White Liars and Black Comedy on 1 February 1968, directed by Peter Wood, with the following cast:

The White Liars:

- Sophie, Baroness Lemberg – Dorothy Reynolds
- Frank – James Bolam
- Tom – Ian McKellen

Black Comedy:

- Brindsley Miller – James Bolam
- Carol Melkett – Angela Scoular
- Miss Furnival – Dorothy Reynolds
- Colonel Melkett – Robert Flemyng
- Harold Gorringe – Ian McKellen
- Schuppanzigh – Ken Wynne
- Clea – Liz Fraser
- Georg Bamburger – Christopher Fagan

White Lies was rewritten extensively by Shaffer for this production and retitled The White Liars.

=== 1976 London revival ===
Black Comedy was revived with The White Liars under the title White Liars & Black Comedy at the Shaw Theatre by the Dolphin Company in July 1976 directed by Paul Giovanni.

White Liars:

- Sophie: Baroness Lemberg – Maggie Fitzgibbon
- Frank – Timothy Dalton
- Tom – Peter Machin

Black Comedy:

- Brindsley Miller – Peter Machin
- Carol Melkett – Gemma Craven
- Miss Furnival – Maggie Fitzgibbon
- Colonel Melkett – Neil McCarthy
- Harold Gorringe –Timothy Dalton
- Schuppanzigh – Milo Sperber
- Clea – Celia Bannerman
- Georg Bamberger – Max Latimer

The White Liars was revised by Shaffer for this production.

=== 1993 Broadway revival ===
White Liars & Black Comedy was revived at Criterion Center Stage Right in 1993 by The Roundabout Theatre Company directed by Gerald Gutierrez with the following cast:

White Liars:

- Sophie, Baroness Lemberg – Nancy Marchand
- Frank – Peter MacNicol
- Tom – David Aaron Baker

Black Comedy:

- Brindsley Miller – Peter MacNicol
- Carol Melkett – Anne Bobby
- Miss Furnival – Nancy Marchand
- Colonel Melkett – Keene Curtis
- Harold Gorringe – Brian Murray
- Schuppanzigh – Robert Stattel
- Clea – Kate Mulgrew
- Georg Bamberger – Ray Xifo

Both Black Comedy and The White Liars were revised by Peter Shaffer for this production. It previewed from 10 August 1993, opened on 1 September 1993, and closed on 3 October 1993, after a total of 25 previews and 38 performances.

=== 1998 London revival ===
Black Comedy was revived as a double-bill with Tom Stoppard's The Real Inspector Hound at the Comedy Theatre by Warehouse Productions on 22 April 1998, directed by Greg Doran with the following cast:

- Brindsley Miller – David Tennant
- Carol Melkett – Anna Chancellor
- Miss Furnival – Nichola McAuliffe
- Colonel Melkett – Gary Waldhorn
- Harold Gorringe – Desmond Barrit
- Schuppanzigh – Geoffrey Freshwater
- Clea – Amanda Harris
- Georg Bamberger – Joseph Millson

Shaffer revised Black Comedy for this production.

== Film adaptation ==
In 1970, Peter Shaffer's twin brother, Anthony Shaffer, had adapted Black Comedy into a screenplay, announcing that it would be his next project, but the film was not produced.

== Licensing ==
The performance rights for Black Comedy are controlled by the Samuel French organisation.

== Sources ==
- Herbert, Ian, ed. (1977). Who's Who in the Theatre (sixteenth ed.). London and Detroit: Pitman Publishing and Gale Research. ISBN 978-0-273-00163-8.
- Shaffer, Peter (1968). Black Comedy. London: Samuel French.
- Shaffer, Peter (1997). Black Comedy and White Lies. New York: Samuel French.
- Shaffer, Peter (1982). Collected Plays. New York: Harmony.
