= Allahabad, Iran =

Allahabad, Iran (Persian: اله‌آباد or, sometimes, الله‌آباد) may refer to:

== Fars Province ==
- Allahabad, Fars, a village in Eqlid County

== Golestan Province ==
- Allahabad, Golestan, a village in Ramian County

== Isfahan Province ==
- Allahabad, Ardestan, a village in Ardestan County
- Allahabad, Jarqavieh Olya, a village in Isfahan County
- Allahabad, Lenjan, a village in Lenjan County
- Allahabad, Nain, a village in Nain County
- Allahabad, Tiran and Karvan, a village in Tiran and Karvan County

== Kerman Province ==
=== Anbarabad County ===
- Allahabad-e Abu Saidi, a village in Anbarabad County
- Allahabad-e Dehqani, a village in Anbarabad County
- Allahabad-e Jahangir Khan, a village in Anbarabad County
- Allahabad-e Olya, Kerman, a village in Anbarabad County
- Allahabad-e Sofla, Kerman, a village in Anbarabad County

=== Bardsir County ===
- Allahabad, Lalehzar, a village in Bardsir County

=== Fahraj County ===
- Allahabad 1, a village in Fahraj County
- Allahabad 2, a village in Fahraj County
- Allahabad-e Chah Rigan, a village in Fahraj County
- Allahabad-e Hajjiabad, a village in Fahraj County
- Allahabad-e Mostowfi, a village in Fahraj County

=== Jiroft County ===
- Allahabad-e Rezvan, a village in Jiroft County
- Allahabad-e Seyyed, a village in Jiroft County

=== Kerman County ===
- Allahabad, Kerman, a village in Kerman County
- Allahabad, Ekhtiarabad, a village in Kerman County
- Allahabad, Rafsanjan, a village in Rafsanjan County

=== Narmashir County ===
- Allahabad-e Tabatbayi, a village in Narmashir County

=== Rigan County ===
- Allahabad-e Chah-e Malek, a village in Rigan County

=== Rudbar-e Jonubi County ===
- Allahabad, Rudbar-e Jonubi, a village in Rudbar-e Jonubi County
- Allahabad, Jazmurian, a village in Rudbar-e Jonubi County

=== Sirjan County ===
- Allahabad, Sirjan, a village in Sirjan County

== Kohgiluyeh and Boyer-Ahmad Province ==
- Allahabad, Kohgiluyeh and Boyer-Ahmad, a village in Boyer-Ahmad County

== North Khorasan Province ==
- Allahabad-e Olya, North Khorasan, a village in North Khorasan Province, Iran
- Allahabad-e Sofla, North Khorasan, a village in North Khorasan Province, Iran

== Razavi Khorasan Province ==
- Allahabad, Torbat-e Heydarieh, a village in Torbat-e Heydarieh County
- Allahabad, Torbat-e Jam, a village in Torbat-e Jam County

== Semnan Province ==
- Allahabad, Semnan, a village in Damghan County

== Sistan and Baluchestan Province ==
- Allahabad, Chabahar, a village in Chabahar County
- Allahabad, Iranshahr, a village in Iranshahr County
- Allahabad, Nukabad, a village in Khash County

== South Khorasan Province ==
- Allahabad, Nehbandan, a village in Nehbandan County
- Allahabad, Tabas, a village in Tabas County

== Tehran Province ==
- Allahabad, Tehran, a village in Tehran Province, Iran

== Yazd Province ==
- Allahabad, Mehriz, a village in Mehriz County
- Allahabad, Yazd, a village in Yazd County
- Allahabad Rural District, in Yazd County
