= Allahabad (disambiguation) =

Allahabad, now officially known as Prayagraj, is a city in the northern Indian state of Uttar Pradesh.

Allahabad may also refer to:

== Places ==
=== Also in India ===
- Allahabad district, now known as Prayagraj district, a district in Uttar Pradesh
- Allahabad division, now known as Prayagraj division, a division in Uttar Pradesh
- Allahabad Lok Sabha constituency, an electoral constituency in Uttar Pradesh
- Allahabad University, Prayagraj, Uttar Pradesh
- Allahabad State University, Prayagraj, Uttar Pradesh
- Illahabad Subah, a former Mughal top-level province
- Allahabad Museum, Prayagraj, Uttar Pradesh

=== Iran ===
- Allahabad, Iran (disambiguation), a list of numerous places in Iran

=== Pakistan ===
- Allah Abad, Rahim Yar Khan, a town in Punjab
- Allahabad, Sindh, a town of Sindh
- Allahabad, Balochistan, a village of Lasbela District, Balochistan
- Allahabad, Jacobabad a union council and village of Jacobabad District, Sindh

== Politics ==
- Allahabad Address, the Presidential Address by Allama Iqbal
- Treaty of Allahabad, the treaty that marks the political and constitutional involvement and the beginning of British rule in India

== Other uses ==
- Allahabad (ship), an English ship that disappeared in 1886
- Allahabad Bank, the oldest joint stock bank in India

== See also ==
- Allahabadi (disambiguation)
- Prayagraj (disambiguation), official name of the city
- Prayag (disambiguation), historical name of the city
- Allahdad
