= Mishra =

Brahmin surname from the Indian subcontinent

Mishra is a surname found among Hindu Brahmins, in the northern, eastern, western and central parts of India and in Nepal. This is the list of notable people with Mishra surname, who may or may not be associated with the Brahmin caste.

== Army personnel ==
- Avijit Misra – Colonel in Indian Army
- B. D. Mishra – former brigadier of the Indian Army, 2nd Lieutenant Governor of Ladakh

== Corporate and business personalities ==
- Rajeev Misra – London-based banker and executive, former CEO of Softbank

== Doctors ==
- Anoop Misra – Endocrinologist
- B. K. Misra – Neurosurgeon
- Mohan Mishra – Physician

== Entertainers ==
- Akhilendra Mishra – Indian film and television character actor.
- Amit Mishra (singer) – Indian singer and songwriter
- Leela Mishra – film actor
- Piyush Mishra – Indian film actor, music director, lyricist, and writer
- Prachi Mishra – Femina Miss India Earth 2012
- Sanjay Mishra (actor) – Indian actor and comedian known from the show Office Office
- S. K. Misro – Telugu film and theatre personality
- Smriti Mishra – Indian film actress famous for her roles in parallel cinema.
- Sudhir Mishra – Indian film director and screenwriter
- Sugandha Mishra – Indian singer and television presenter
- Vanya Mishra – Femina Miss India 2012
- Pravisht Mishra – Indian Television actor since 2011
- Vishal Mishra (composer) - Indian music composer and singer
- Vishal Mishra (director) - Indian Hindi film writer and director

== Government officers ==
- Baidyanath Misra – former 1 of the Odisha University of Agriculture and Technology
- Brajesh Mishra (First National Security Advisor of India)
- Durga Shanker Mishra -Principal Secretary Ministry of housing and urban affairs, India
- Nripendra Misra – Principal Secretary to the Prime Minister of India
- Ramakant Mishra – IAS officer and renowned scholar
- Satyananda Mishra – National Security Advisor
- Vikas Mishra (economist) – former Vice-Chancellor of Kurukshetra University

== Judiciary ==
- Arun Kumar Mishra – Former Judge of the Supreme Court of India and current Chairperson of National Human Rights Commission of India
- Dipak Misra – Former Chief Justice of India
- Gyan Sudha Mishra – Judge of the Supreme Court of India
- Kanhaiya Lal Misra – Advocate General (Uttar Pradesh)
- Manoj Misra – Judge of the Supreme Court of India
- Prashant Kumar Mishra – Judge of the Supreme Court of India
- Ranganath Misra – Former Chief Justice of India, known for 'Mishra Commission'

== Performing artists ==
- Baiju Bawra – Singer
- Bhubaneswari Mishra – Odia classical singer
- Birju Maharaj – Kathak dancer
- Chhannulal Mishra – Hindustani classical music singer
- Debojyoti Mishra – Indian music director and film composer
- Lalmani Misra – Indian classical musician
- Lisa Mishra – American singer and composer
- Rajan and Sajan Mishra – Contemporary North Indian Musician
- Sanjay Mishra (musician) – Indian born American guitarist and composer
- Shivnath Mishra – Indian sitarist and composer
- Pravisht Mishra – Indian actor from Prayagraj, Uttar Pradesh, India

== Poets and scholars ==
- Ayachi Mishra - Indian philosopher (Nyaya Shastra) from Mithila.
- Bhawani Prasad Mishra – Poet (1913–1985)
- Godabarish Mishra – Poet
- Hara Prasad Misra – Scholar in oxidative free radical research
- Hemanta Mishra, Nepalese conservation biologist
- Jayamant Mishra (1925–2010), Sanskrit scholar and Maithili poet
- Keshavdas – Sanskrit scholar
- Madan Mohan Mishra, Nepalese author
- Maṇḍana Miśra – 8th century Indian philosopher, Maṇḍana Miśra is best known as the author of the Brahmasiddhi
- Pakshadhara Mishra - Indian philosopher and an eminent Acharya of Nyaya in Mithila
- Prabhat Mishra, Professor in the Department of Computer and Information Science and Engineering and a UF Research Foundation Professor at the University of Florida
- Rambhadracharya, Jagadguru Ramanandacharya Swami Rambhadracharya, Founder Tulsi Peeth and Founder Chancellor Jagadguru Rambhadracharya Handicapped University, Chitrakoot
- Ramdarash Mishra (1924–2025), Indian poet, writer and academic
- Shankara Mishra - 15th century CE, Indian philosopher from Mithila.
- Srivatsanka Mishra – also called Koorathazhwar, Philosopher in Vishishtadvaita philosophy & disciple of Ramanujacharya
- Vācaspati Miśra, 10th century scholar, Author of TattvaBindu

== Politicians ==
- Abhishek Mishra – Former member of the legislative assembly of Uttar Pradesh.
- Bhadrakali Mishra – Senior (Nepali) politician, Minister and Chairperson of King Bridendra's Privy Council
- Chaturanan Mishra – Former Indian Agriculture Minister
- Dwarka Prasad Mishra – Politician, former chief minister of Madhya Pradesh
- Gajaraj Mishra, Nepalese politician and courtier allied to Prince Chautariya Bahadur Shah of Nepal and Vamsharaj Pande
- Hari Shankar Mishra – Nepali politician, former MP and Governor of Province No 2 (son of Ram Narayan Mishra)
- Ishwar Dayal Mishra – Former minister Physical Infrastructure Govt Of Nepal and member of Constitutional assembly
- Jagannath Mishra – Politician, former chief minister of Bihar
- Janeshwar Mishra (Samajwadi Party Leader)
- Kalraj Mishra – Former Union Minister for MSME
- Lalit Narayan Mishra – Former Indian Rail Minister
- Narottam Mishra – Minister of Home Affairs in the Government of Madhya Pradesh
- Navendu Mishra – British Labour MP
- Nitish Mishra – JDU Leader Bihar and state Cabinet minister of Bihar
- Prem Chandra Mishra – Member of Legislative Council, Bihar, Indian National Congress politician and former Bihar NSUI Chief.
- Rabindra Mishra, Nepalese politician and former journalist
- Ram Naryan Mishra – Nepali politician, Minister in BP Koirala cabinet (brother of Bhadrakali Mishra)
- Satish Chandra Mishra (BSP Leader) Former Advocate General UP
- Shyam Nandan Prasad Mishra – Indian National Congress politician, eminent Parliamentarian and Central Minister
- Sripati Misra (Former Chief Minister of Uttar Pradesh)
- Surjya Kanta Mishra – CPIM Leader, Leader of Opposition Bengal Assembly
- Vijay Mishra - Indian gangster and a politician who has represented Gyanpur Assembly constituency
- Brijesh Mishra Saurabh, former Member of Uttar Pradesh Legislative Assembly

== Sportsperson ==
- Amit Mishra – Indian cricketer
- Mohnish Mishra – Indian cricketer
- Suresh Kumar Mishra – Former Indian volleyball team captain
- Tanmay Mishra – Kenyan cricketer
- Abhimanyu Mishra – US Chess player of Indian origin holding the record of being the youngest Chess Grandmaster in the world.

== Writers ==
- Govind Mishra – Indian novelist.
- Jaishree Misra – Indian essay-ist and novelist
- Pankaj Mishra – Indian essay-ist and novelist
- Pratap Narayan Mishra – Indian writer
- Subimal Mishra – Indian Bengali novelist, short story writer, and essayist

== Other notable persons ==
- Anupam Mishra – Environmentalist & water conservationist
- Columbia Mishra – Indian-American aerospace engineer
- Neelesh Misra – Journalist
- Prayag Mishra – Canadian social media personality
- Rahul Mishra – Indian fashion designer
- Rakesh Mishra – Indian scientist specialising in genomics and epigenetics
- Sameer Mishra – 81st Scripps National Spelling Bee champion (USA)
- Sourav Mishra – Reuters journalist, one of the first witnesses of 2008 Mumbai Attacks
- Sudhir Kumar Mishra – Aerospace engineer, CEO of BrahMos Aerospace
- Vishal Misra – Indian-American scientist at Columbia University
