= Deh-e Gowd =

Deh-e Gowd or Deh Gowd or Dehgowd (Persian: ده گود) may refer to:

- Deh-e Gowd, Anbarabad
- Deh Gowd, Qaleh Ganj
- Deh-e Gowd, Rudbar-e Jonubi
