= Allahabad-e Olya =

Allahabad-e Olya (Persian: اله ابادعليا) or Allahabad-e Bala (Persian: اله ابادبالا), both meaning "Upper Allahabad", may refer to:

- Allahabad-e Olya, Kerman
- Allahabad-e Olya, North Khorasan
- Allahabad-e Bala, Sistan and Baluchestan Province
