= Allahabad-e Sofla =

Allahabad-e Sofla (Persian: اله ابادسفلي) or Allahabad-e Pain (Persian: اله ابادپايين) may refer to:

- Allahabad-e Sofla, Kerman
- Allahabad-e Sofla, North Khorasan
