= Jagannath Das Ratnakar =

Indian poet (1866–1932)

Jagannath Das "Ratnakar"
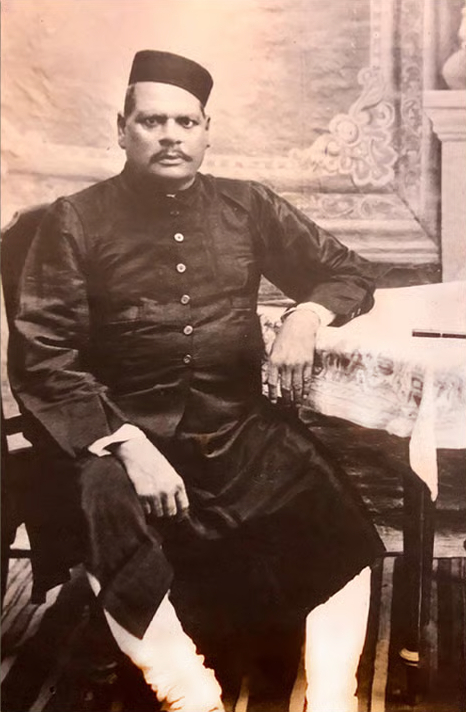
- Born: 14 September 1866; Benares
- Died: 21 June 1932 (aged 65)
- Occupations: Poet, editor, scholar
- Writing career
- Pen name: Ratnakar
- Language: Braj Bhasha

Jagannath Das "Ratnakar" (14 September 1866 – 21 June 1932) was a modern Indian poet, editor, and scholar who composed poetry predominantly in Braj Bhasha.

== Early life and education ==
Jagannath Das was born on 14 September 1866 in Benares. He completed his Bachelor of Arts from Queen's College, Banaras, in 1892. Following the death of his mother, he was unable to pursue further education.

During his student years, he composed Urdu and Persian poetry under the pen name "Zaki" (meaning "intelligent"). Later in his literary career, he transitioned exclusively to writing poetry in Braj Bhasha.

== Career and interests ==
In 1902, Ratnakar began working as the private secretary to Pratap Narayan Singh, the ruler of Ayodhya. Following Singh's death in 1906, he continued serving as private secretary to the Maharani (queen).

Ratnakar traveled across most parts of India. He conducted deep studies of ancient languages such as Sanskrit and Prakrit, as well as modern Indian languages including Bengali, Punjabi, and Marathi. His academic pursuits covered diverse disciplines, including Ayurveda, music, archaeology, history, and yoga. He was also deeply fond of religion and literature.

== Literary career and public life ==
Ratnakar worked as an editor for the Hindi journals Sahitya Sudhanidhi and Saraswati. He contributed significantly to the establishment and growth of literary organizations, including the Nagari Pracharini Sabha in Varanasi and the Rasik Mandal in Prayag. The Nagari Pracharini Sabha published the majority of his collected works.

He presided over several major literary assemblies:

- President of the All India Hindi Sahitya Sammelan in Calcutta (1922)
- President of the All India Kavi Sammelan in Kanpur (1925)
- President of the Hindi section at the 4th Oriental Conference (1926)

Ratnakar also wrote scholarly prose articles on topics such as language, grammar, prosody, poetics, biographies of poets, and historical themes.

== Selected works ==
=== Poetic compositions ===
- Hindola (1894)
- Samalochanadarsh (1919) – A translation of Pope's Essay on Criticism into the Rola meter
- Kalkashi
- Shringarlahari
- Gangavataran (1927)
- Virashtak (1928)
- Uddhav Shatak (1929)

=== Edited works ===
- Sudhasar (1887)
- Kavikul Kanthabharana (1889)
- Hammir Hath (1893)
- Samasyapurti (1894)
- Narvashirakh (1896)
- Sujansagar (1897)
- Bihari Ratnakar (1922)
