= Pratibha Agrawal =

Indian theatre archivist, theatre artist and translator (born 1930)

- Born: 10 August 1930 (age 96); Varanasi, British India
- Education: Shantiniketan
- Occupations: theatre archivist, theatre actress, scriptwriter, director, writer and translator
- Writing career
- Notable awards: Sangeet Natak Akademi Award for her overall contributions Sahitya Akademi Translation Prize; Ratna Sadasya by Uttar Pradesh Sangeet Natak Akademi; Uttar Pradesh Hindi Sansthan Award
- Website: www.pratibhaagrawal.com

Pratibha Agrawal (born 10 August 1930) is an Indian theatre archivist, theatre actress, scriptwriter, director, writer and translator from Varanasi, Uttar Pradesh. She is the founder of Natya Shodh Sansthan, a theatre archive and research institute in Kolkata. She received many awards including Sangeet Natak Akademi Award for her overall contributions, Sahitya Akademi Translation Prize, and awards from Uttar Pradesh Sangeet Natak Akademi, Uttar Pradesh Hindi Sansthan, Madhya Pradesh Sahitya Parishad, and the Bharatiya Anuvad Parishad.

== Biography ==
Pratibha Agrawal was born on 10 August 1930 in Bharatendu Bhawan, Banaras. While studying in the fifth grade, her mother became bedridden due to tuberculosis, and when she was only ten years old, her mother died. After her mother's death, she was brought up by her grandmother.

Pratibha started dancing and singing while studying in Varanasi. Pratibha, who started reading at a young age, had memorized one hundred and fifty poems at an early age. Her father who was a drama artist, used to go to perform a play somewhere every day. Sometimes he would take his daughter to watch a play with him. After watching the play, she was inspired by drama and started participating in plays at the school's annual function. Then, at the age of thirteen, she made her stage debut by acting in her grandfather Radha Krishna Das's play 'Maharana Pratap' at the annual festival of the Mahila Mandalam in Kashi. She secured first position in the matriculation examination.

While she was in theatre field, Madan Mohan Agrawal met Pratibha. Impressed by her beauty, he proposed to her. On 15 February 1945, he married her without taking any dowry. At that time, Pratibha was 15 years old and Madan Mohan was 25 years old. Fifteen days after the wedding, Pratibha reached Kolkata with her husband. A year after her marriage, Pratibha was sent to Shantiniketan for intermediate studies. After three years, she returned to Kolkata from Shantiniketan.

Pratibha made her first stage acting debut in Kolkata with the play 'Do Athi'. Later, she continued her studies along with acting. After her M.A., she did D.Phil and D.Litt. She also taught in Shikshayatan College in Calcutta during 1950-1970.

== Career ==
=== Theatre ===
At the age of 13, Pratibha entered the theatre acting by playing a leading role in her grandfather's play 'Maharana Pratap'. She gained further attention for her performance in the dance play based on the story 'Shataranj Ke Khiladi', directed by Acharya Hazari Prasad Dwivedi.

From the late 1940s to the early 1950s, she emerged as a leading heroine in Hindi theatre. During this period, she performed plays under the banner 'Tarun Sangh' and later under the banner 'Anamika'. From the late 1950s to the late 1990s, she contributed as a Hindi theatre director and heroine. She played lead roles under the direction of prominent directors like Shyamanand Jalan, Shivkumar Joshi, Vimal Lath. Her contributions in translations of famous plays are also significant. Dube Sen's play "Janata Ka Shatru" was translated into Hindi in 1959.

In 1981, Pratibha Agrawal founded the Natya Shodh Sansthan, a theatre research institute in Kolkata. The institute has compiled a historical archive of facts related to theatres, theatre artists and theatre institutions in all languages of India. The institute provides comprehensive information on the tradition and history of theatre in India. The institute has collected rare materials used for theatre, drama manuscripts, posters, theatre reviews, newspaper and magazine clippings, magazines, books, audio-video cassettes, film stage models, slides, gramophone recordings, photographs, costumes, jewellery and brochures.

The institute's library and museum have hundreds of books on theatre, rare manuscripts and interviews of four hundred people. For the convenience of researchers, the catalogue of Natya Shodh Sansthan has been published in three volumes. It is edited by Pratibha Agarwal. The institute has also been active in the field of publishing. The first book published by Pratibha Agarwal on Master Fida Hussain was published in 1986.

After the establishment of her institute, Pratibha gave up acting and directing, but she did important work through the institute, including the collection and preservation of theatre-related materials.

=== Literary career ===
Pratibha Agrawal is also a writer and translator. Her original works - Sajan Ka Sukh Dukh (meaning: Joys and Sorrows of Creation), Dastak Zindagi Ki (meaning: The Breakdown of Life) and Mod Zindagi Ka (meaning: The Turning Point of Life) in Hindi have been widely acclaimed. All three books are partially autobiographical. In these books, she has also presented the history of the Hindi theatre in Kolkata. In this series, her book Kahani Madan Babu Ki (meaning: story of Madan Babu) can also be mentioned.

Pratibha has also written poems. His poetry collection Khel Khel Mein is a collectible book for children. She has written a biographical novel titled Pyare Harichand ji. Her research paper titled 'Hindi Language Styles: An Analytical Discussion' is also a valuable work. As a translator, she has translated notable works into Hindi including Henrik Ibsen's An Enemy of the People (1959),Rabindranath Tagore's Shesh Raksha (1963), Badal Sircar's Ebang Indrajit (1969), Utpal Dutt's Tin ki Talwar (1979), and Jayavant Dalvi's Hurry Up, Hari (1995).

== Autobiography ==
Pratibha Agrawal wrote her autobiography in two parts. The first part of the autobiography Dastak Zindagi Ki, published in the year 1990, is about the struggles of her life from childhood to marriage. The second part Mod Zindagi Ka published in the year 1996, is about her life after marriage, and coming to Kolkata. In the autobiography, the she has mentioned every small but important thing of her life.

== Awards and honors ==
In 2005, Pratibha Agrawal was awarded the Sangeet Natak Akademi Award for her overall contribution to the performing arts. In 2016 she received the 21st Aditya Vikram Birla Kalashikhar Award for Excellence in Indian Theatre by Sangit Kala Kendra. She received Ratna Sadasya Award of the Uttar Pradesh Sangeet Natak Akademi in 1975, award of the Uttar Pradesh Hindi Sansthan in 1989, Madhya Pradesh Sahitya Parishad Award in 1993, and the Bharatiya Anuvad Parishad Award in 1997. In 2018, the Sahitya Akademi awarded her Sahitya Akademi Translation Prize for her Hindi translation of author Sombhu Mitra's Bengali work Abhinay Natak Manch.
