= Pahetiya =

Pahetiya Pahetia
- Gram Panchayat
- Location in bihar, India Pahetiya (India)
- Coordinates: 25°45′35.2″N 85°14′19.0″E
- Country: India
- State: Bihar
- District: Vaishali
- Assembly Constituency: Hajipur Assembly Constituency (AC.123)

Languages
  - Official: Hindi, Bajjika, Maithili, Bhojpuri and English
- Time zone: UTC+5:30 (IST)
- ISO 3166 code: IN-BR

Pahetiya or Pahetia is the largest village in the Pahetia Panchayat, located in the Vaishali district of Bihar, just 9 kilometres from the district headquarters, Hajipur.

== History ==
The history of Pahetiya is rooted in the legacy of the Bhumihar community. Mythology and local lore recount the story of three brothers, Kashyap Gotriya mahbaria babhan mool, who first settled in this fertile land, laying the foundation for the village. Their descendants, now divided into three ancestral groups—10 Bhaiya, 8 Bhaiya, and 4 Bhaiya, carry forward their legacy with pride. The Bhumihars, traditional landowners and farmers, have shaped Pahetia’s identity for generations. Their title,Thakur symbolises their historical role as custodians of the land and leaders of the community. Some bhumihar also use their surnames Mishra, Singh, and Sharma.

== Other communities ==
While Bhumihars are central to Pahetia’s identity, the village thrives on its vibrant diversity. Communities like the Dusadh or Paswan, Mallah or Nishad, Chamar, Dhobi, Kanu, Tanti or Tatwa, and Koeri also call Pahetia home, contributing to its social and cultural fabric. The Dusadh, forming the largest population group, are known for their resilience and dedication. The Mallah, skilled in aquatic trades, are the second-largest group.

== Geography and land use ==
This panchayat is located at 25°45′35.2″N 85°14′19.0″E and considerable area, making it the largest village in the Panchayat in terms of both population and land area. The village's fertile lands are suitable for agriculture, which is the mainstay of its economy. The Bhumihar community, being the majority landowners, engages extensively in farming, with others working as labourers or in subsidiary agricultural roles.

== Cultural and social aspects ==
Pahetia’s residents celebrate various festivals with great fervour, showcasing their deep-rooted cultural traditions. Festivals like Chhath Puja, Holi, Devothani, and Diwali are celebrated collectively, cutting across caste lines to a large extent. However, caste identities remain a significant part of the village’s social interactions, as is common in many rural areas of Bihar. Devothani or Devuthani is only celebrated among Bhumihars.

== Nearest city/town ==
Located just 9 kilometres from Hajipur, the district headquarters of Vaishali, Pahetia, benefits from its strategic location. The proximity to Hajipur ensures access to better education, healthcare, and market facilities for the villagers. This close connection with the district hub has also brought some modern influences to the otherwise traditional village lifestyle.

== Nearest major road highway or river ==
National highway 22 (nearest highway)

== Villages in panchayat ==
There are villages in this panchayat

s.n	villages
1	Pahetia
2	Salempur Kishundas
3	Salempur Kishundas
4	Nonpur
5	Chak Bhatandi
6	Bhatandi
7	Malikpur Pipra Urf Panapur
8	Birra
9	Mirnagar Arazi
