= Ramakant =

Given name

Ramakant is a given name. Notable people with the name include:

- Ramakant Achrekar (1932–2019), Indian cricket coach from Mumbai
- Ramakant Angle, Indian politician
- Ramakant Desai (1939–1998), represented India in Test cricket as fast bowler
- Ramakant Goswami (born 1944), the member of Legislative Assembly of Delhi from Rajendra Nagar
- Ramakant Khalap (born 1947), Indian politician from Goa, India
- Ramakant Mishra a former IAS officer and scholar who died of a heart attack in 2011 in New Delhi
- Ramakant Rath (born 1934), one of the most renowned modernist poets in the Oriya literature
- Ramakant Yadav (politician) (born 1957), Indian politician
- Ramakant Yadav (neurologist), professor of neurology
