= Brijeshwar Singh =

Indian writer, poet and theatre activist (born 1968)

- Born: 1968 (age 57–58); Lucknow
- Occupations: Writer; poet; theatre activist
- Known for: Helping children born with thalassemia avail regular and life saving blood transfusions
- Spouse: Garima Singh
- Parent: Rajendra Bahadur Singh (Father) Gayatri Devi (Mother)
- Awards: Uttar Pradesh Sangeet Natak Akademi award, 2020

Brijeshwar Singh (born 22 September 1968), is a writer, poet and theatre promoter based in Bareilly, Uttar Pradesh, India. His patronage and promotion of theatre through the Rang Vinayak Rang Mandal theatre repertoire and the annual theatre festival being organized in his own Windermere Theatre earned him the U.P. Sangeet Natak Academy award for 2020. His Daya Drishti Charitable Trust helps children born with thalassemia avail regular and lifesaving transfusions. His second book 'Next Patient, Please' was released on 26 March 2022. He was featured among top 75 personalities of Rohilkhand region of Uttar Pradesh by Amar Ujala. The list was published on the 75th foundation day of the newspaper.

== Early life ==
Singh was born on 22 September 1968 in Lucknow to Rajendra Bahadur Singh and Gayatri Devi. His father was an officer in Provincial Services. In Lucknow, Brijeshwar was educated at City Montessori School. Later, his father was transferred to Bareilly where Brijeshwar studied at Government Inter College (GIC). He completed his higher studies from King George's Medical College (now known as King George's Medical University), Lucknow and Ganesh Shankar Vidyarthi Memorial Medical College (GSVM), Kanpur.

== Theatre promotion ==
Brijeshwar fell in love with theatre during his days at New Delhi when a friend introduced him to the play "Tumhari Amrita" starring Farooq Sheikh and Shabana Azmi.

When Brijeshwar came back to Bareilly, he established a theatre repertoire and named it 'Rang Vinayak Rang Mandal' (RVRM). He is the founder and director of RVRM.

In 2009, Brijeshwar Singh built a black box theatre at Bareilly. The auditorium is called Windermere Theatre.

Brijeshwar Singh is the organizer of the Annual Windermere Theatre Festival at Bareilly. He has organized 15 editions of the festival.

The latest edition of the festival was organized as 'Windermere Theatre Festival & Awards 2025' from 23 February to 1 March 2025 at the Windermere Theatre in Bareilly. This edition opened with "Traasadi" - an invited play by renowned film and theatre personality Manav Kaul. It was followed by 'Avalanche' by The Gathered, "Raghunath" by Abhimukh, Notunor Naatghor from Assam. The third day witnessed two plays; the first one titled "Desdemona Roopakam" by Nalanda Arts Studio, Bengaluru and the second one titled "Be-Loved" by Tamaasha Theatre, Mumbai. It was followed by "Mehroon" by Ujaagar Dramatic Association, Jaipur on 27 February and "Agarbatti" by Samaagam Rangmandal, Jabalpur on 28 February. The last evening of the festival witnessed a gripping performance of "Urmila" by Adishakti, Puducherry.

Brijeshwar's patronage and promotion of theatre earned him the U.P. Sangeet Natak Akademi award for 2020.

Brijeshwar Singh has started offering grants to upcoming talent in theatre. It is called the 'Windermere Theatre Grant'.

On 13 June 2023, the Governor of Uttar Pradesh Anandiben Patel felicitated Brijeshwar Singh with the prestigious UPSNA Award for his exemplary contribution to theatre promotion. The felicitation ceremony was held at the Gandhi Auditorium of the Raj Bhawan in Lucknow.

Dr. Brijeshwar Singh was nominated for the prestigious Padma Shri Award for two consecutive years in 2023 and 2024 under the ‘Theatre sub-category of Art Category’.

== Playwright, Author & Poet ==
Brijeshwar wrote his first book, In & Out of Theatre: Heart-Warming Vignettes from Beyond the Operation Theatre, in 2014. The book was published by Supernova Publishers.

Brijeshwar Singh is also a playwright. He has written two plays titled 'Paladin' and 'Zindagi Zara Si Hai'.

He has recently completed his second book Next Patient, Please. Which was published on 26 March 2022.

Brijeshwar Singh also writes poems in Hindi. Some of his poems have been published on “Hindwi” which is India’s leading portal of Hindi portal. His story, "Keh do Gunjan!" was published in India Today's annual literature edition, 2019. "Next patient, please" has been showcased at the World Book Fair 2023.

== Philanthropy ==
Brijeshwar Singh founded Daya Drishti Charitable Trust. The charitable organization helps children born with thalassemia avail regular and lifesaving transfusions. The trust also offers free medical services to the underprivileged. Brijeshwar Singh has also been providing expert advice on major incidents related to thalassemia. Recently, he talked to an online media platform regarding the Nagpur (Maharashtra, India) incident where four thalassemic kids got infected with HIV because of unsafe blood transfusion.
