= Vishal Mishra =

Vishal Mishra may refer to:

- Vishal Mishra (composer), Indian music composer and singer
- Vishal Mishra (director), Hindi film writer and director

== See also ==
- Vishal Misra, Indian-American scientist
