= Rekha Jain =

Indian playwright and director (1924–2010)

- Born: Rekha Goyal; 24 September 1924; Agra, British India
- Died: 2010 (aged 85–86); Delhi, India
- Occupation: Children's Theatre director
- Years active: 1956 - 2010
- Spouse: Nemi Chandra Jain
- Children: 4, including Kirti Jain
- Awards: Sangeet Natak Akademi Award (2006); Uttar Pradesh Sangeet Natak Akademi Award

Rekha Jain (1924–2010) was an Indian children's playwright, director, and folk music expert. In addition to plays for children, she has also written articles and reviews on Indian folk music and folk dance. She received awards from the Hindi Academy, Sahitya Kala Parishad, Uttar Pradesh Sangeet Natak Akademi, Delhi Natya Sangham, Delhi Rotary Club, Sahityakar Samman, Delhi Hindi Academy etc. In 2006, the Sangeet Natak Akademi honoured her with the Sangeet Natak Akademi Award for overall contributions.

== Biography ==
Rekha Jain was born as Rekha Goyal on 28 September 1924, into a conservative Baniya joint family in Agra, Uttar Pradesh.

On 3 May 1936, at the age of 12, Rekha Goyal married Nemi Chandra Jain, who belonged to a wealthy business family but was attracted to progressive ideas and Marxism. The marriage ceremony was conducted in a traditional manner, according to Vaishnava beliefs and later Jain rituals.

Jain, a progressive, encouraged his wife Rekha to pursue education and participate in life outside the home. When her husband moved to Calcutta and became involved in the activities of the IPTA, Rekha Jain also developed an interest in drama and began singing in the choir. In her memoirs, Rekha describes her husband as a very enlightened and progressive man, but one who sometimes imposed his will on her. While in Kolkata, she studied diplomas in Hindi literature and Hindustani classical music. She has also trained at the Asian Theatre Institute.

In Kolkata, she joined the Communist Party and continued her association with the Indian People's Theatre Association (IPTA). Later, they moved to Bombay. As part of IPTA, in the 1940s, they toured the country to promote ideas and raise funds.

While in Bombay, she made her debut as an actress in a play directed by Sombhu Mitra. She worked in cultural activities and theatre as part of the central squad of the IPTA. At that time, the headquarters of the Communist Party of India was in Bombay, which helped the couple establish close contacts with several prominent communist leaders and prominent theatre, music and film personalities.

Rekha Jain, who witnessed the Great Bengal Famine and the immense human suffering that resulted from it, would stand at the gate of the Prithviraj Kapoor Auditorium after the plays and appeal to people to donate whatever they could for the relief of the Bengal famine victims.

=== Personal life and death ===
Rekha and her husband Nemi Chandra Jain have four children, one of whom, Kirti Jain, is a noted theatre artist. Her son, Sanjay Jain is a Senior Professor at Department of Physics and Astrophysics, University of Delhi. The other two children are Urmi Bhushan Gupta and Rashmi Vajpayee. She died in April 2010 at the age of eighty-five.

== Career ==
From 1944 to 1947, she was the principal dancer in the dance troupe of the Jan Natya Sangha. Later, she became involved with children's theatre and started providing theatre training to children at the Delhi Children's Theatre Institute from 1956.

She was very active in the children's theatre scene in Delhi from 1956 until her death in 2010. She conducted several theatre workshops for children and wrote, directed and produced plays for them. Camps were held in Lucknow, Agra, Bhilai, Gorakhpur, Ujjain, Bhopal, Imphal, and Bangalore. She has also directed several television plays for children. As a children's theater expert, she has traveled to countries such as Yugoslavia, Bulgaria, the Soviet Union, East Germany, England, USA, and France. Rekha Jain has developed a distinctive style of theatre that uses music, dance, and poetry, and also aims to promote the cognitive development of children.

In 1979, she founded Umang, a children's theatre organization in Delhi. She was also the founder-secretary of the women's organization 'Kalyani'.

Surya Prakashan Mandir, Bikaner, has released the memoirs of the Rekha Jain titled Yad Ghar (House of Memories) and 31 children's plays she wrote and directed titled Bachon Ki Duniya (Children's World) as a two-volume set. The introduction to their memoirs, written by their four children, states that the original memoirs were over 1,500 pages long. They were initially edited by Ramkumar Krishak and reduced to a thousand pages, but were still considered too long, so they were further reduced with the help of Piyush Daya and the final version was prepared.

In 2009, Umang, started awarding Bal Rang Samman (later Rekha Jain Bal Rang Samman), an annual award for excellence in the field of children's theatre.

She was also a reviewer of gramophone records in the 'Dharmayuga' from 1965 to 67 and wrote articles in various newspapers and magazines on folk songs, music and dance. She has also worked as a presenter of many folk songs, music and metaphors on All India Radio and Doordarshan.

== Works ==
Rekha Jain wrote the children' play Kaun Bada Kaun Chota in 1989 and it was first staged in 1990. Malyang Ki Koochi (later revised and renamed as Anokhi Koochi) written and directed by her in 1999, is based on a Chinese folktale. Sa Re Ga Ma Tak Dhina, Dhin, which she wrote, is a play that talks about the role of music in the development of children.

== Awards and honors ==
In 2024, the Raza Foundation organized 'Balrang Drishya' as a centenary tribute to the life and work of Rekha Jain, a pioneer in children's theatre in India. She has also received awards from the Hindi Academy, Sahitya Kala Parishad, Uttar Pradesh Sangeet Natak Akademi, Delhi Natya Sangham, Delhi Rotary Club, Sahityakar Samman, Delhi Hindi Academy etc. In 2006, the Sangeet Natak Akademi honoured her with the Sangeet Natak Akademi Award for overall contributions for her contributions to drama.

== Works on her ==
Her biography, Rekha Jain (2001), written by Mahesh Anand, was published by the National School of Drama.
