= List of shipwrecks in September 1886 =

The list of shipwrecks in September 1886 includes ships sunk, foundered, grounded, or otherwise lost during September 1886.

== 1 September ==
List of shipwrecks: 1 September 1886
Ship	State	Description
Harriet R	United Kingdom	The brigantine was run down by a steamship and sank 15 nautical miles (28 km) south east of the Owers Lightship ( Trinity House). Her six crew escaped in the ships boat and landed at Dover, Kent.
Poplar	United Kingdom	The steamship collided with the steamship Cerdic at South Shields, County Durham and was severely damaged.
Zeal	United Kingdom	The ship struck rocks at Porto, Portugal. She was on a voyage from Porto to Cádiz, Spain. She was declared a total loss.

== 2 September ==
List of shipwrecks: 2 September 1886
Ship	State	Description
Dotterel	United Kingdom	The steam yacht sprang a leak and sank in The Downs. Her three crew survived. She was later refloated and taken in to Dover, Kent with the assistance of a tug and a lighter. It was found that she had been deliberately scuttled, a hole having been made in her port bow by her owner using a hatchet and a chisel. She was on a voyage from Dover to Wivenhoe, Essex.
Homeward Bound	United Kingdom	The cutter was sighted off Ascension Island whilst on a voyage from the Natal Colony to an English port. She subsequently capsized in the Bay of Biscay with the loss of all on board.
Paraense	United Kingdom	The steamship ran aground on the Goodwin Sands, Kent. She was on a voyage from Antwerp, Belgium to Lisbon, Portugal. She was refloated with assistance from the tug Condor (United Kingdom) and resumed her voyage.
Star	United Kingdom	The barque was wrecked in the Cumberland Straits. Her crew were rescued by Chieftain (United Kingdom).

== 3 September ==
List of shipwrecks: 3 September 1886
Ship	State	Description
Perseverance	United Kingdom	The schooner sprang a leak and foundered in the English Channel off Berry Head, Devon. Her crew were rescued by the schooner Francis (United Kingdom). Perseverance was on a voyage from Newcastle upon Tyne, Northumberland to Galway.

== 4 September ==
List of shipwrecks: 4 September 1886
Ship	State	Description
Allahabad	United Kingdom	The ship communicated with South Australian (United Kingdom) in the South Atlantic on this date. No further trace, presumed foundered with the loss of all hands. She was on a voyage from Glasgow, Renfrewshire to Dunedin, New Zealand.
Catherina Sevastopulo	Greece	The schooner was destroyed by fire 75 nautical miles (139 km) off Cerigo. Her crew were rescued by the steamship Golden Horn (United Kingdom). Catherina Sevastopulo was on a voyage from Cardiff, Glamorgan, United Kingdom to the Dardanelles.

== 5 September ==
List of shipwrecks: 5 September 1886
Ship	State	Description
Victoria	United Kingdom	The schooner was wrecked on Tortuga, Venezuela. Her eight crew survived, but one of them subsequently died from injuries sustained. She was on a voyage from Cardiff to La Guaira, Venezuela.

== 6 September ==
List of shipwrecks: 6 September 1886
Ship	State	Description
Kremlin	United Kingdom	The steamship was wrecked at Cape Finisterre, Spain. Her crew were rescued. She was on a voyage from Patras, Greece to London.
Mabel	United Kingdom	The barque was wrecked on the English Bank, in the River Plate. Her crew were rescued.
Victory	United Kingdom	The schooner was stranded on La Tortuga Island, Venezuela and became a total loss.

== 8 September ==
List of shipwrecks: 8 September 1886
Ship	State	Description
Aludra	United Kingdom	The steamship ran aground at Cardiff, Glamorgan. She was refloated and resumed her voyage.
Baron	United Kingdom	The fishing trawler collided with the fishing trawler Myra and sank in Plymouth Sound. Her crew were rescued.
Jessie, and Superior	United Kingdom	The ships were driven ashore and wrecked at Garrow Point, Aberdeenshire whilst assisting in refloated Prince Alfred (United Kingdom).
Tay and Tees	United Kingdom	The packet ship sprang a leak and foundered off Start Point, Devon. Her crew were rescued by the smack Annie (United Kingdom). Tay and Tees was on a voyage from Teignmouth, Devon to Waterford.
Yum Yum	United Kingdom	The yacht capsized on the Shoebury Sand, in the Thames Estuary off the coast of Essex. The sole crew member aboard was rescued.

== 9 September ==
List of shipwrecks: 9 September 1886
Ship	State	Description
Lady Aline	United Kingdom	The steamship was run into by the steamship Galea (Spain) and sank at Bilbao, Spain.
Onward	United Kingdom	The ship was driven ashore at Littlehampton, Sussex. Her crew were rescued.

== 10 September ==
List of shipwrecks: 10 September 1886
Ship	State	Description
Carl Johan	Germany	The schooner ran aground on the Longsand, in the Lynn Deeps off the coast of Norfolk, United Kingdom. She was on a voyage from Stettin to Wisbech, Cambridgeshire, United Kingdom. She was refloated and beached at Wisbech Eye.
Caroline	Germany	The schooner was destroyed by fire at Bremerhaven. Her crew were rescued. She was on a voyage from Bremerhaven to Memel.
Erasmus Wilson	United Kingdom	The steamship collided with the steamship Lord Alfred Paget and was beached at Lowestoft, Suffolk.
Fitzroy	United Kingdom	The barque was driven ashore at Littlestone-on-Sea, Kent. She was on a voyage from London to Mauritius. She was refloated with the assistance of a tug and taken in to Dover, Kent.
Violet	United Kingdom	The fishing trawler was damaged by fire at Leith, Lothian.

== 11 September ==
List of shipwrecks: 11 September 1886
Ship	State	Description
Akaba	United Kingdom	The steamship ran aground on the Azalea Rock, in the Red Sea. She was refloated on 13 September and resumed her voyage.

== 13 September ==
List of shipwrecks: 13 September 1886
Ship	State	Description
Ancon	United States	The ship struck a rock in 0.5 nautical miles (0.9 km; 0.6 mi) off Point Gustavus in Icy Strait while attempting to enter Glacier Bay in Southeast Alaska. The rising tide refloated her three hours later on 14 September, and she was beached 1.5 nautical miles (2.8 km; 1.7 mi) from the rock to prevent her from sinking. After repairs, she returned to service in mid-December 1886. A United States Coast and Geodetic Survey team sent to chart the rock she struck named it "Ancon Rock" in November 1886.
Lyra	United Kingdom	The steam lighter ran aground off Glennan Head. She was beached at Kildonan, Isle of Arran. Her crew were rescued. She was on a voyage from Glenarm, County Antrim to Glasgow, Renfrewshire. She was refloated and taken into the Clyde in a leaky condition.
Nellie	(United Kingdom of Great Britain and Ireland) Isle of Man	The fishing boat was wrecked at Fifeness, Fife. Her crew survived. She was refloated and taken in to Anstruther, Fife for repairs.
Thomas Brown	(United Kingdom of Great Britain and Ireland) Isle of Man	The fishing boat was wrecked on the Carr Rock, in the Firth of Forth. Her crew survived.

== 14 September ==
List of shipwrecks: 14 September 1886
Ship	State	Description
Arctic	United Kingdom	The schooner was abandoned in the Atlantic Ocean. Her crew took to a boat; they were rescued on 21 September by the brigantine Fiery Cross (United Kingdom). Arctic was on a voyage from Puerto Cabello, Venezuela to Swansea, Glamorgan.
Adieu	United Kingdom	The schooner ran aground on the East Hoyle Bank, in Liverpool Bay and was wrecked. Her crew were rescued by the Hoylake Lifeboat. She was subsequently refloated.
Elizabeth	United Kingdom	The ship sprang a leak and was abandoned off "Bardsey". Her crew were rescued by the tug United States (United Kingdom). Elizabeth was on a voyage from Port Dinorwic, Caernarfonshire to Liverpool, Lancashire.
Gipsy	United Kingdom	The schooner was driven ashore in the Larne Lough.
Good Templar	United Kingdom	The ketch ran aground and sank off Piel Island, Lancashire. She was refloated and taken in to Barrow-in-Furness, Lancashire.
Royal William	United Kingdom	The schooner ran aground at Porthcawl, Glamorgan. She was on a voyage from Porthcawl to Wexford.
Unnamed	United Kingdom	The dredger was run into by the Thames barge Frindsbury (United Kingdom) and sank in the River Thames near Grays Thurrock, Essex. Her crew survived.

== 15 September ==
List of shipwrecks: 15 September 1886
Ship	State	Description
Bonita	United Kingdom	The schooner was run into by the schooner Rescue (United Kingdom) and sank between the Longships and the Runnel Stone, Cornwall. Her crew were rescued by Rescue.
Czarina	Flag unknown	The steam yacht was driven ashore. She was refloated and taken in to Cowes, Isle of Wight, United Kingdom.
Guy Mannering	United Kingdom	The steamship collided with the steamship Diana Vernon and was severely damaged. Guy Mannering was on a voyage from Rothesay, Isle of Bute to Kilcreggan, Argyllshire. She was beached at Kilcreggan but was subsequently refloated and taken in to the Clyde for repairs.
Hero	United Kingdom	The Thames barge was run down and sunk in the River Thames at Greenwich, Kent by the steamship Glen Rosa (United Kingdom). Her crew were rescued.
Kingfisher	United Kingdom	The fishing boat collided with the schooner Eugenie (United Kingdom) and sank off Helwick Head, County Waterford with the loss of three of her four crew.
Minnie Cole	United Kingdom	The schooner was damaged by fire at Bangor.
Strathnairn	United Kingdom	The steamship collided with the steamship Clan Graham (United Kingdom) and sank in the Clyde at Partick, Renfrewshire. Her crew were rescued. She was refloated on 2 October and later returned to service.
William and Sarah	United Kingdom	The fishing boat was run down and sunk in the Thames Estuary off Leigh-on-Sea, Essex by the Thames barge Industry (United Kingdom).

== 16 September ==
List of shipwrecks: 16 September 1886
Ship	State	Description
Halcyone	United Kingdom	The yacht was run down and sunk by a steamship at Belfast, County Antrim.

== 17 September ==
List of shipwrecks: 17 September 1886
Ship	State	Description
Jalo	Russia	The ship ran aground on the Cork Sand, in the North Sea off the coast of Essex, United Kingdom. She was on a voyage from Turku, Grand Duchy of Finland to Málaga, Spain.
Marie Blanche	France	The lugger sprang a leak and put in to Plymouth, Devon, United Kingdom, where she sank. Her crew were rescued. She was on a voyage from Dieppe, Seine-Inférieure to Bristol, Gloucestershire, United Kingdom. As a danger to navigation, the wreck and its limestone cargo were dispersed by explosives in mid-October.
Victoria Cross	United Kingdom	The barque struck Daunt's Rock and was beached in Rocky Bay, where she sank. Her crew survived. She was on a voyage from San Francisco, California, United States to Galway.

== 18 September ==
List of shipwrecks: 18 September 1886
Ship	State	Description
Dempsey	United Kingdom	The barge struck the pier and sank at Liverpool, Lancashire.
Thomas and Sarah	United Kingdom	The ship foundered in the Bristol Channel. Her three crew were rescued by the steamship Palma (United Kingdom).

== 20 September ==
List of shipwrecks: 20 September 1886
Ship	State	Description
Alfred the Great	United Kingdom	The barque was abandoned in the Atlantic Ocean 45 nautical miles (83 km) north west of the Butt of Lewis, Outer Hebrides. Her thirteen crew took to two boats; eight crew in one boat reached land, five crew in the other boat were reported missing. She was on a voyage from Quebec City, Canada to Newcastle upon Tyne, Northumberland.
Zuid Holland	Netherlands	The steamship was damaged by fire at Batavia, Netherlands East Indies.

== 21 September ==
List of shipwrecks: 21 September 1886
Ship	State	Description
Arctic	United Kingdom	The barquentine was abandoned in the Atlantic Ocean (46°30′N 19°30′W). All on board were rescued by Fiery Cross (United Kingdom). Arctic was on a voyage from Tucacas, Venezuela to Swansea, Glamorgan.
Catherine	Germany	The schooner was abandoned in the North Sea 200 nautical miles (370 km) off Spurn Point, Yorkshire, United Kingdom, Her crew were rescued.

== 22 September ==
List of shipwrecks: 22 September 1886
Ship	State	Description
Adelaide	United Kingdom	The ship collided with a mud barge in the River Mersey and ran aground. She was reflaoted and taken in to Runcorn, Cheshire.
Marianne Greaves	United Kingdom	The brig collided with the steamship River Lagan (United Kingdom) in the River Thames and was beached at the Tilbury Fort, Essex. Marianne Greaves was on a voyage from Arkhangelsk, Russia to London. She was refloated on 24 September and taken in to London.

== 23 September ==
List of shipwrecks: 23 September 1886
Ship	State	Description
Marion	United Kingdom	The steamship ran aground at Garston, Lancashire. She was on a voyage from Riga, Russia to Liverpool, Lancashire. She was refloated and taken in to Garston.

== 24 September ==
List of shipwrecks: 24 September 1886
Ship	State	Description
Gemini	United Kingdom	The fishing boat was run down and sunk at Dublin by the steamship Mayo (United Kingdom).
Maid of Aln	United Kingdom	The ship was abandoned in the Atlantic Ocean. Her crew were rescued by Belvedere (United Kingdom) and she was set afire. Maid of Aln was on a voyage from Grangemouth, Stirlingshire to Buenos Aires, Argentina.
Mandovi	India	The steamship collided with the steamship Mathilde (Germany) and sank off Dover, Kent, United Kingdom. All seventeen people on board were rescued by Mathilde. Mandovi was on a voyage from Grangemouth, Stirlingshire, United Kingdom to Bombay.
Mary Ann	United Kingdom	The schooner collided with Somerset (Flag unknown) and sank off St. John's, Newfoundland Colony with the loss of four of the 27 people on board.

== 25 September ==
List of shipwrecks: 25 September 1886
Ship	State	Description
G. P. Payzant	United Kingdom	The ship departed from Grand Saline, Haiti for Falmouth, Cornwall or Queenstown, County Cork. No further trace, reported missing.

== 27 September ==
List of shipwrecks: 27 September 1886
Ship	State	Description
Fairlie Jane	United Kingdom	The ship struck the breakwater at Holyhead, Anglesey and was abandoned. Her crew were rescued. She was on a voyage from Dublin to Caernarfon.
Hulda	Russia	The brigantine sank at Dunball, Somerset, United Kingdom when the brigantine Nautilus (United Kingdom) listed against her.
Incolin	Germany	The barque ran aground and sank at Niuzhuang, China.

== 28 September ==
List of shipwrecks: 28 September 1886
Ship	State	Description
Catherina	Germany	The galiot was abandoned in the North Sea. Her crew were rescued by the fishing smack John Vere (United Kingdom). Catharina was on a voyage from Sunderland, County Durham, United Kingdom to Memel.
Le Grand	United Kingdom	The barge struck one of the piers of London Bridge and sank.
Maude	United Kingdom	The ship struck the Runnel Stone, Cornwall. She was on a voyage from Piteå, Sweden to Cardiff, Glamorgan. She put in to Falmouth, Cornwall in a waterlogged condition.
Rhein	United Kingdom	The steamship ran ashore on the eastern side of Lizard Point, Cornwall.
Star of Albion	United Kingdom	The full-rigged ship ran aground and was wrecked in the Hooghly River, India.
Suffolk	United Kingdom	The steamship was wrecked in fog on the eastern side of Lizard Point. All 33 people aboard were rescued. She was on a voyage from Baltimore, Maryland, United States to London.
Sydney Dacres	United Kingdom}	The barque was wrecked at Port Stanley, Falkland Islands. Her crew were rescued. She was under tow of the steamship Ranee (United Kingdom) when the tow rope broke and she went ashore.

== 29 September ==
List of shipwrecks: 29 September 1886
Ship	State	Description
Gog	United Kingdom	The Mersey Flat collided with a mud hopper and sank in the River Mersey.

== 30 September ==
List of shipwrecks: 30 September 1886
Ship	State	Description
Three Friends	United Kingdom	The Thames barge was run into by the steamship Princess Mary (United Kingdom) at Rotherhithe, Surrey.

== Unknown date ==
List of shipwrecks: Unknown date in September 1886
Ship	State	Description
Andalina	Norway	The brig capsized in the North Sea. Her crew were rescued by the barque Delaware (Austria-Hungary). Andalina was subsequently taken in to Westray, Orkney Islands, United Kingdom.
Ann Crowden	United Kingdom	The ship was driven ashore at Shell Haven, Essex. She was on a voyage from Douglas, Isle of Man to London.
Argus	France	The full-rigged ship foundered at sea. Her crew were rescued. She was on a voyage from Bordeaux, Gironde to Swansea, Glamorgan, United Kingdom.
Atalanta	Norway	The barque ran aground on the Middelgrunden, in the Baltic Sea. She was on a voyage from Sundsvall, Sweden to Algoa Bay.
Benledi, and Sarah Ann	United Kingdom	The steamships collided and were both severely damaged. Benledi was on a voyage from Taranto, Italy to Nicholaieff, Russia. She was beached at "Havak", Ottoman Empire. Sarah Ann was taken in to Constantinople, Ottoman Empire.
Carolina	Denmark	The schooner was driven ashore and wrecked at Thisted. She was on a voyage from Charlestown, South Carolina, United States to Nyköping, Sweden.
Dunottar Castle	United Kingdom	The ship was wrecked on an island 1,200 nautical miles (2,200 km) off Honolulu, Kingdom of Hawaii.
E. B. Sidbury	United States	The steamship was lost at the mouth of the Rio Grande del Norte.
Ellen	United Kingdom	The ship was wrecked at Kunda, Russia. She was on a voyage from West Hartlepool, County Durham to Kunda.
Elma	United Kingdom	The brigantine ran aground on the Beal Bar. She was later refloated and taken in to Limerick in a leaky condition.
Enid	United Kingdom	The ship was driven ashore 2 nautical miles (3.7 km) from Key Francis. She was on a voyage from Antwerp, Belgium to Havana, Cuba.
Florence	Spain	The steamship caught fire at Las Palmas, Canary Islands. She was beached and scuttled. She was refloated and found to be severely damaged.
Galloway Lass	United Kingdom	The schooner was driven ashore near Menai Bridge, Anglesey.
Garron Tower	United Kingdom	The steamship struck the pier and sank at Dunkirk, Nord, France. She was on a voyage from Sunderland, County Durham to Dunkirk.
Girl of the Period	United Kingdom	The schooner was driven ashore opposite Thames Haven, Essex. She was on a voyage from Gravesend, Kent to South Shields, County Durham.
Grasbrook	Germany	The steamship ran aground in the Saint Lawrence River. She was on a voyage from Antwerp, Belgium to Montreal, Quebec, Canada. She was refloated and taken in to Montreal, where she arrived on 9 September.
Harvest Home	United Kingdom	The ship was driven ashore and wrecked on Anticosti Island, Nova Scotia, Canada.
Henry	United Kingdom	The ship was driven ashore near Little River, Maine, United States. She became severely hogged and was declared a total loss.
Hornet	Falkland Islands	The schooner was driven ashore in the Falkland Islands before 25 September. She was refloated.
Isabel	United Kingdom	The ship was destroyed by fire at Lobos.
Jacinth	United Kingdom	The schooner was driven ashore on Tory Island, County Donegal. She was later refloated.
John Wells	United Kingdom	The steamship ran aground in the Scheldt at the Nieuwe Neuzen Polder. She was on a voyage from Goole, Yorkshire to Ghent, East Flanders, Belgium.
Laburnums	(Dominion of Newfoundland) Newfoundland Colony	The schooner was wrecked near Indian Tickle. She was on a voyage from Labrador to Newfoundland.
Lakkenshaab	Denmark	The sloop was abandoned in the North Sea before 15 September.
Lancaster	United Kingdom	The steamship caught fire at Savannah, Georgia, United States. The fire was extinguished.
Mandalay	United Kingdom	The steamship ran aground at Martinique. She was on a voyage from Cardiff, Glamorgan to Martinique. She was refloated and taken in to Martinique in a leaky condition.
Maria Catharina	Norway	The barque was driven ashore. She was refloated and taken in to Helsingør, Denmark, where she arrived on 16 September in a leaky condition.
Martha	United Kingdom	The barque ran aground on the Neckmansgrund, in the Baltic Sea. She was on a voyage from Kotka, Grand Duchy of Finland to London.
Mathilde	Germany	The schooner was wrecked on Mauritius.
Mary White	United Kingdom	The schooner was driven ashore in Egypt Bay, Kent. She was on a voyage from Whitstable to Gravesend.
Minerva	Norway	The schooner was driven ashore in Holmsound, Orkney Islands.
Mingong	China	The ship collided with Isaokiang (China) and was severely damaged. She put in to Tianjin.
Nariva	United States	The ship ran aground in the Buttermilk Channel. She was on a voyage from Port of Spain, Trinidad to New York. She was refloated.
Olinda	United Kingdom	The barque was driven ashore and wrecked on Cape Sable Island, Nova Scotia.
Presto	United Kingdom	The steamship ran aground at Lyserort, Russia. She was refloated and put back to Riga, Russia in a leaky condition.
Reaper	(United Kingdom of Great Britain and Ireland) Isle of Man	The schooner was driven ashore at Amack, Denmark. She was on a voyage from Stettin, Germany to Gothenburg, Sweden.
Rennie	United Kingdom	The steamship was driven ashore at Muniscar Point, Malta. She was on a voyage from Marianople, Russia to Cartagena, Spain.
Sardonyx	Flag unknown	The steamship was driven ashore at Nanaimo, British Columbia, Canada. She was later refloated and towed to San Francisco, California, United States for repairs.
Satellite	United Kingdom	The barque was abandoned in the Atlantic Ocean before 25 September. Her crew were rescued by the barque Themis (France).
Singapore	United Kingdom	The barque was driven ashore at Point Indio, Argentina. She was refloated.
Sofia	France	The brig ran aground on the Kentish Knock. She was on a voyage from Sundsvall to Tunis, Tunisia. She was refloated and taken in to Great Yarmouth, Norfolk, United Kingdom in a waterlogged condition.
Stella	Norway	The schooner was wrecked "north of Jedder" with some loss of life. She was on a voyage from Newcastle upon Tyne, Northumberland, United Kingdom to Stavanger.
S. W. Kelly	United Kingdom	The steamship ran aground on the Farilheon Rocks, in the Mediterranean Sea. She was on a voyage from London to Thessaloniki, Greece. She was refloated.
Tertia	Germany	The steamship ran aground on the Middelgrund. She was on a voyage from Härnösand, Sweden to Amsterdam, North Holland, Netherlands. She was refloated and resumed her voyage.
Ville de Metz	France	The steamship was driven ashore and wrecked near Sarco Punta, 62 nautical miles (115 km) north of Coquimbo, Chile. Her crew were rescued. She was on a voyage from Callao, Peru to Havre de Grâce, Seine-Inférieure.
Volmer	Denmark	The steamship collided with the steamship Perim (United Kingdom) at Kronstadt, Russia and was severely damaged. Volmer was on a voyage from Copenhagen to Kronstadt.
Weston	United Kingdom	The steamship was driven ashore on Rutland Island, County Donegal.
Unnamed	Flag unknown	A steamship foundered off Belle Isle, Newfoundland Colony. A large quantity of wreckage washed ashore. (no subsequent reports of the loss of a relevant ship found).
Unnamed	United States	The dredger was run into by the steamship City of Alexandria (United States) and sank at New York.
Unnamed	Flag unknown	The ship was wrecked off "Shaweisham", China with the loss of all hands.
