= Fida Hussain (actor) =

Indian theatre actor (1899–1999)

- Born: 1899; Moradabad, British India (present-day Uttar Pradesh, India)
- Died: 1999 (aged 99–100)
- Occupations: actor, singer, director, and playwright
- Awards: Uttar Pradesh Sangeet Natak Akademi Award (1978); Sangeet Natak Akademi Award (1985)

Fida Hussain (1899–1999) was an Indian actor, singer, director, and playwright associated with the Parsi theatre tradition and early Indian cinema. He received the Uttar Pradesh Sangeet Natak Akademi Award in 1978 and the Sangeet Natak Akademi Award for theatre in 1985.

== Biography ==
Fida Hussain was born in 1899 in Moradabad in present-day Uttar Pradesh. He was born into a family where singing and acting were strictly prohibited. However, he was drawn to music and acting at a very young age. His father was kind, but his uncle beat him whenever he was caught participating in music sessions. Once, his sister-in-law tried to ruin his voice by giving him vermilion hidden in his food.

In 1917, he joined Ray Dayal's drama club and with the help of the club's director, he ran away from home in 1918 and reached Delhi, where he joined the New Alfred Theatre Company. In 1968, Hussain retired from active performance and returned to his hometown of Moradabad.

Fida Hussain died in 1999.

== Theatre career ==
In 1917, he joined Ray Dayal's drama club and played his first female role in Shahi Fakir. Later, with the help of the club's director, he ran away from home in 1918 and reached Delhi, where he joined the New Alfred Theatre Company.

When Fida Hussain was working with Shah Jahan Company in Karachi, Govardhan Babu, a co-owner of Moonlight Theatres in Calcutta, invited him his team. Although he arrived in Calcutta at his invitation, Hussain initially refused to join Moonlight and instead collaborated with other Marwari troupes in Calcutta itself.

During World War II, when Kolkata was declared an 'emergency zone', he recruited several members from the 'Moonlight' troupe, bought their theatrical equipment, formed a sole proprietorship, the 'Narsi Theatre Company', and set out for Kanpur. But, when the Quit India Movement broke out in 1942 under the leadership of Mahathma Gandhi, the company was closed; he paid everyone their wages and sent them away, leaving the equipment behind, and returned to his native Moradabad.

The very next day after his arrival in Moradabad, Kishan Lal Bhatia, Babu Roshanlal's manager, arrived from Delhi and invited him there. Hussain accepted the invitation and joined his theatre company, where he staged Narsi Mehta for them. The play ran for three hundred nights in Delhi itself to packed audiences, and he received many awards for it, including a medal from the Bharatpur princely state, a medal from the Maharaja of Patiala and a medal from Jaipur. He worked there for three years.

Hussain joined Moonlight Theatres in 1948. In Moonlight, he took on leadership responsibilities also. During this period, he directed productions and acted in lead roles for approximately 20 years. His most noted performance was that of the devotee 'Narsi'. He retired from Moonlight in 1968.

Subsequently, starting in 1990, he conducted seminars on acting and direction at the National School of Drama.

Hussain was also considered as a moving encyclopedia of the theatre world of that era.

In addition to theatre, he recorded music for the HMV label in Calcutta.

== Film career ==
When sound films became popular, Fida Hussain became active in Parsi cinema, and worked in the industry for nearly thirty years as an actor-singer. His filmography includes:

- Ramayan (1934)
- Insaf Ki Tope (1934)
- Kunwari Ya Vidhwa (1935)
- Diljaani (1935)
- Dil Ki Pyaas (1935)
- Daku Ka Ladka (1935)
- Balidaan (1935)
- Khudaai Kitmadgaar (1937)
- Matwali Meera (1940)
- Bambaiwali (1941)
- Arabian Nights (1946)
- Toote Sapne (1946, unreleased)

== Awards and honors ==
Hussain received the Uttar Pradesh Sangeet Natak Akademi Award in 1978. In 1985, he was awarded the Sangeet Natak Akademi Award for his contributions to the theatre.

== Biography ==
Hussain's life story was documented in the book Fida Hussain: Fifty Years in the Parsi Theatre, an oral history recorded by theatre scholar Pratibha Agrawal and published in 1986. The work provides insight into both his personal journey and the broader history of Parsi theatre during his time.
