= Hashim Raza =

Hashim Raza may refer to:

- Hashim Raza Allahabadi Abdi (1929–1989), an Indian politician.
- Syed Hashim Raza (1910–2003), a leading bureaucrat and former Governor of East Pakistan.
- Syed Hashim Raza Jilani, a Pakistani politician who is member of the Provincial Assembly of Sindh.
