= Prayagraj (disambiguation) =

Prayagraj is a metropolitan city in the northern Indian state of Uttar Pradesh.

Prayagraj may also refer to:

- Prayagraj district, district of Uttar Pradesh
- Prayagraj division, administrative unit of Uttar Pradesh
- Prayagraj Junction railway station, railway station in the city.
- Prayag Junction railway station, satellite station in the city.
- Prayagraj Chheoki railway station, railway station in the city

== See also ==
- Prayag (disambiguation), historical name of the city
- Allahabad (disambiguation)
