= Lay Siyah Rural District =

Rural district in Isfahan province, Iran

Lay Siyah Rural District Persian: دهستان لائ سياه
- Rural District
- Location within Iran
- Coordinates: 32°44′N 52°57′E
- Country: Iran
- Province: Isfahan
- County: Nain
- District: Central
- Established: 1987
- Capital: Homaabad-e Olya

Population (2016)
  - Total: 2,302
- Time zone: UTC+3:30 (IRST)

Lay Siyah Rural District (Persian: دهستان لائ سياه) is in the Central District of Nain County, Isfahan province, Iran. Its capital is the village of Homaabad-e Olya.

== Demographics ==
=== Population ===
At the time of the 2006 National Census, the rural district's population was 2,541 in 871 households. There were 2,553 inhabitants in 956 households at the following census of 2011. The 2016 census measured the population of the rural district as 2,302 in 916 households. The most populous of its 111 villages was Homaabad-e Olya, with 343 people.

=== Other villages in the rural district ===
- Allahabad
- Dowlatabad-e Sheykh
- Fudaz
- Mozaffarabad
- Owshen-e Olya
- Sereshk
