= Sereshk, Isfahan =

Village in Isfahan province, Iran

Sereshk Persian: سرشك
- Village
- Location within Iran
- Coordinates: 32°41′05″N 52°54′53″E
- Country: Iran
- Province: Isfahan
- County: Nain
- District: Central
- Rural District: Lay Siyah

Population (2016)
  - Total: 100
- Time zone: UTC+3:30 (IRST)

Sereshk (Persian: سرشك) (Note: Also known as Sereshg) is a village in Lay Siyah Rural District of the Central District in Nain County, Isfahan province, Iran.

== Demographics ==
=== Population ===
At the time of the 2006 National Census, the village's population was 61 in 24 households. The following census in 2011 counted 55 people in 22 households. The 2016 census measured the population of the village as 100 people in 37 households.
