= Allahabadi =

An Allahabadi is a thing or person of or from the Indian city of Allahabad. (see list). It may refer to:

== People ==
- Akbar Allahabadi, Urdu poet
- Muhibullah Allahabadi, Sufi scholar
- Purnam Allahabadi, Urdu poet
- Hashim Raza Allahabadi Abdi, Indian politician

== Food ==
- Allahabadi cake, a traditional Indian rum fruit cake
- Allahabadi Surkha, a variety of guava
