= Yasrabad =

Village in North Khorasan province, Iran

Yasrabad Persian: ياسراباد
- Village
- Location within Iran
- Coordinates: 37°24′09″N 58°07′49″E
- Country: Iran
- Province: North Khorasan
- County: Shirvan
- District: Central
- Rural District: Howmeh

Population (2016)
  - Total: 229
- Time zone: UTC+3:30 (IRST)

Yasrabad (Persian: ياسراباد) (Note: Also romanized as Yaserabad, Yāserābād, and Yāsrābād; also known as Khān Ḩeşār, Khāneh Ḩeşār (خانه حصار), and Pas Hesār) is a village in Howmeh Rural District of the Central District in Shirvan County, North Khorasan province, Iran.

== Demographics ==
=== Population ===
At the time of the 2006 National Census, the village's population was 197 in 55 households. The following census in 2011 counted 177 people in 55 households. The 2016 census measured the population of the village as 229 people in 68 households.
