= Dowlatabad-e Sheykh =

Village in Isfahan province, Iran

Dowlatabad-e Sheykh Persian: دولت ابادشيخ
- Village
- Location within Iran
- Coordinates: 32°45′13″N 52°55′04″E
- Country: Iran
- Province: Isfahan
- County: Nain
- District: Central
- Rural District: Lay Siyah

Population (2016)
  - Total: 96
- Time zone: UTC+3:30 (IRST)

Dowlatabad-e Sheykh (Persian: دولت ابادشيخ) (Note: Also romanized as Dowlatābād-e Sheykh; also known as Daulatābād and Dowlatābād) is a village in Lay Siyah Rural District of the Central District in Nain County, Isfahan province, Iran.

== Demographics ==
=== Population ===
At the time of the 2006 National Census, the village's population was 73 in 21 households. The following census in 2011 counted 107 people in 38 households. The 2016 census measured the population of the village as 96 people in 37 households.
