= Mozaffarabad, Isfahan =

Village in Isfahan province, Iran

Mozaffarabad Persian: مظفرآباد
- Village
- Location within Iran
- Coordinates: 32°42′09″N 52°50′50″E
- Country: Iran
- Province: Isfahan
- County: Nain
- District: Central
- Rural District: Lay Siyah

Population (2016)
  - Total: 102
- Time zone: UTC+3:30 (IRST)

Mozaffarabad (Persian: مظفرآباد) (Note: Also romanized as Moz̧affarābād) is a village in Lay Siyah Rural District of the Central District in Nain County, Isfahan province, Iran.

== Demographics ==
=== Population ===
At the time of the 2006 National Census, the village's population was 113 in 34 households. The following census in 2011 counted 115 people in 34 households. The 2016 census measured the population of the village as 102 people in 34 households.
