= Qalandarabad, North Khorasan =

Village in North Khorasan province, Iran

Qalandarabad Persian: قلندر آباد
- Village
- Location within Iran
- Coordinates: 37°26′57″N 57°58′31″E
- Country: Iran
- Province: North Khorasan
- County: Shirvan
- District: Central
- Rural District: Howmeh

Population (2016)
  - Total: 391
- Time zone: UTC+3:30 (IRST)

Qalandarabad (Persian: قلندر آباد) (Note: Also romanized as Qalandarābād) is a village in Howmeh Rural District of the Central District in Shirvan County, North Khorasan province, Iran.

== Demographics ==
=== Population ===
The village did not appear in the 2006 National Census. The following census in 2011 counted 264 people in 68 households. The 2016 census measured the population of the village as 391 people in 113 households.
