= Hesar-e Devin =

Village in North Khorasan province, Iran

Hesar-e Devin Persian: حصاردوين
- Village
- Location within Iran
- Coordinates: 37°17′55″N 58°01′34″E
- Country: Iran
- Province: North Khorasan
- County: Shirvan
- District: Central
- Rural District: Howmeh

Population (2016)
  - Total: 230
- Time zone: UTC+3:30 (IRST)

Hesar-e Devin (Persian: حصاردوين) (Note: Also romanized as Ḩeşār-e Devīn; also known as Ḩeşār) is a village in Howmeh Rural District of the Central District in Shirvan County, North Khorasan province, Iran.

== Demographics ==
=== Population ===
At the time of the 2006 National Census, the village's population was 433 in 117 households. The following census in 2011 counted 327 people in 110 households. The 2016 census measured the population of the village as 230 people in 89 households.
