= Borzolabad =

Village in North Khorasan province, Iran

Borzolabad Persian: برزل اباد
- Village
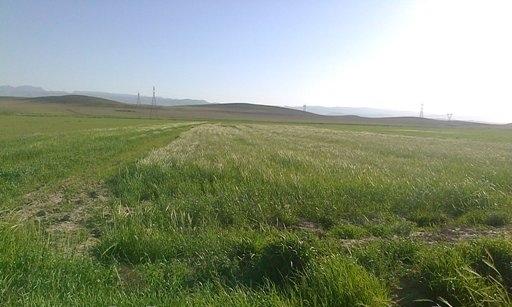
- Landscape near the village of Borzolabad

- Location within Iran
- Coordinates: 37°19′23″N 58°07′26″E
- Country: Iran
- Province: North Khorasan
- County: Shirvan
- District: Central
- Rural District: Howmeh

Population (2016)
  - Total: 432
- Time zone: UTC+3:30 (IRST)

Borzolabad (Persian: برزل اباد) (Note: Also romanized as Borzolābād; also known as Borzīlābād and Burzilābād) is a village in Howmeh Rural District of the Central District in Shirvan County, North Khorasan province, Iran.

== Demographics ==
=== Population ===
At the time of the 2006 National Census, the village's population was 601 in 159 households. The following census in 2011 counted 574 people in 178 households. The 2016 census measured the population of the village as 432 people in 130 households.
