= Next patient please =

2021 health book by Brijeshwar Singh

Next patient, please
- Author: Brijeshwar Singh
- Cover artist: Prasanth Ramakrishnan
- Language: English
- Publisher: Rupa Publications India
- Publication date: 26 March 2022
- Publication place: India
- Pages: 180
- ISBN: 978-93-9091-850-8

Next patient, please is the second book written by Indian author Brijeshwar Singh. Published by Rupa Publications India, the book is a collection of 38 stories narrated by the practicing trauma surgeon who is also a theatre activist.

== Background ==
Brijeshwar Singh wrote Next patient, please based on interactions with his patients over a course of four years. Through these stories, the author has tried to capture the essence of human conviction. How patients' lives and attitudes change because of a traumatic event is an integral part of these stories based on the surgeon's conversations with his patients.

== Theme ==
Set in backgrounds ranging from the dusty by-lanes of small town to big-city blues, the stories are mainly themed on how patients are cured by humanism and a human touch as much as they are by surgical procedures and medicines. The stories talk about accidents, genetic defects, hopes and despair, stigmas and social acceptance.

== Characters ==
The stories revolve around a range of characters that include a 102-year-old nawab who served the British Army in pre-independence India and a girl who wouldn't let anything – not even her scarred and broken limbs – break her spirit. There are characters named after popular north Indian snacks such as "samosa" and "pakodi" who add a great sense of positivity to the collection of stories.

== Reception ==
Next patient, please was officially released on 26 March 2022, at New Delhi, India. Theatrist, author and film actor Manav Kaul was the chief guest of the ceremony.

The book also received positive review from senior journalist Saurabh Dwivedi, Hindi author Suman Keshari, Urdu Writer Khalid Jawed. Critics have also written about the brief poems that Dr Brijeshwar has placed before the prose.
