= Amirabad, Shirvan =

Village in North Khorasan province, Iran

Amirabad Persian: امير آباد
- Village
- Location within Iran
- Coordinates: 37°23′27″N 58°00′25″E
- Country: Iran
- Province: North Khorasan
- County: Shirvan
- District: Central
- Rural District: Howmeh

Population (2016)
  - Total: 279
- Time zone: UTC+3:30 (IRST)

Amirabad (Persian: امير آباد) (Note: Also romanized as Amīrābād) is a village in, and the capital of, Howmeh Rural District in the Central District of Shirvan County, North Khorasan province, Iran. The previous capital of the rural district was the village of Allahabad-e Olya.

== Demographics ==
=== Population ===
At the time of the 2006 National Census, the village's population was 255 in 65 households. The following census in 2011 counted 341 people in 104 households. The 2016 census measured the population of the village as 279 people in 84 households.
