= Baghan, North Khorasan =

Village in North Khorasan province, Iran

Baghan Persian: باغان
- Village
- Location within Iran
- Coordinates: 37°27′14″N 58°03′37″E
- Country: Iran
- Province: North Khorasan
- County: Shirvan
- District: Central
- Rural District: Howmeh

Population (2016)
  - Total: 557
- Time zone: UTC+3:30 (IRST)

Baghan (Persian: باغان) (Note: Also romanized as Bāghān; also known as Bāghīn and Bāqān) is a village in Howmeh Rural District of the Central District in Shirvan County, North Khorasan province, Iran. Baghan was near the epicenter of the 1929 Kopet Dag earthquake.

== Demographics ==
=== Population ===
At the time of the 2006 National Census, the village's population was 528 in 161 households. The following census in 2011 counted 1,072 people in 184 households. The 2016 census measured the population of the village as 557 people in 180 households.
