= Chalu, North Khorasan =

Village in North Khorasan province, Iran

Chalu Persian: چلو
- Village
- Location within Iran
- Coordinates: 37°22′20″N 57°56′03″E
- Country: Iran
- Province: North Khorasan
- County: Shirvan
- District: Central
- Rural District: Howmeh

Population (2016)
  - Total: 1,846
- Time zone: UTC+3:30 (IRST)

Chalu (Persian: چلو) (Note: Also romanized as Chalū) is a village in Howmeh Rural District of the Central District in Shirvan County, North Khorasan province, Iran.

== Demographics ==
=== Population ===
At the time of the 2006 National Census, the village's population was 949 in 208 households. The following census in 2011 counted 1,385 people in 360 households. The 2016 census measured the population of the village as 1,846 people in 509 households. It was the most populous village in its rural district.
