= Nemi Chandra Jain =

Indian writer

- Born: 16 August 1919; Agra, India
- Died: 2005 (aged 85–86)
- Occupation: Writer
- Spouse: Rekha Jain
- Children: Urmi Bhushan Gupta, Rashmi Vajpeyi, Kirti Jain and Sanjay Jain
- Awards: Padma Shri

Nemi Chandra Jain (1919-2005) was an Indian poet, critic, theatre personality and the founder of Natarang Pratishthan, a charitable trust established in 1989 for the promotion of theatre, arts, literature and culture in India. He was born on 16 August 1919 in Agra and was a holder of a master's degree (MA) in English. He served the National School of Drama as a senior lecturer from 1959 till 1982 and also worked with The Statesman and The Economic Times as a columnist. He founded Natrang, a theatre magazine, was its editor and visited many countries with his theatre activities. He was the author of Octave Strings (1944), Solitary (1973), Navanna (2002), Aage Gahan Andhera Hai (2007) and Rang Dharshan (2008) besides several translations and critical essays on a variety of subjects. including From the Wings, Notes on Indian Theatre, which is a prescribed text for academics at Christ University.

Jain was honoured by the Government of India in 2003 with Padma Shri, the fourth highest Indian civilian award. He died two years later, in 2005. Natrang Pratishthan has instituted an annual lecture to honour his memory.

His wife, Smt. Rekha Jain was a children playwright, dancer and writer. She was founder director of Umang Children's theatre. His daughter, Kirti Jain is also an eminent theatre artist and served the National School of Drama as The Director from 1988 till 1995. His son, Sanjay Jain is professor at Department of Physics and Astrophysics, University of delhi and has served as head of the department.

== See also ==
- National School of Drama
