= Devin, North Khorasan =

Village in North Khorasan province, Iran

Devin Persian: دوين
- Village
- Location within Iran
- Coordinates: 37°18′33″N 58°02′55″E
- Country: Iran
- Province: North Khorasan
- County: Shirvan
- District: Central
- Rural District: Howmeh

Population (2016)
  - Total: 945
- Time zone: UTC+3:30 (IRST)

Devin (Persian: دوين) (Note: Also romanized as Devīn) is a village in Howmeh Rural District of the Central District in Shirvan County, North Khorasan province, Iran.

== Demographics ==
=== Population ===
At the time of the 2006 National Census, the village's population was 1,310 in 412 households. The following census in 2011 counted 1,241 people in 372 households. The 2016 census measured the population of the village as 945 people in 333 households.
