= Fudaz =

Village in Isfahan province, Iran

Fudaz Persian: فوداز
- Village
- Location within Iran
- Coordinates: 32°41′46″N 52°59′06″E
- Country: Iran
- Province: Isfahan
- County: Nain
- District: Central
- Rural District: Lay Siyah

Population (2016)
  - Total: 94
- Time zone: UTC+3:30 (IRST)

Fudaz (Persian: فوداز) (Note: Also romanized as Fūdāz; also known as Piyaz (پياز)) is a village in Lay Siyah Rural District of the Central District in Nain County, Isfahan province, Iran.

== Demographics ==
=== Population ===
At the time of the 2006 National Census, the village's population was 253 in 69 households. The following census in 2011 counted 66 people in 34 households. The 2016 census measured the population of the village as 94 people in 41 households.
