= Rezaabad, Howmeh =

Village in North Khorasan province, Iran

Rezaabad Persian: رضااباد
- Village
- Location within Iran
- Coordinates: 37°18′37″N 58°08′55″E
- Country: Iran
- Province: North Khorasan
- County: Shirvan
- District: Central
- Rural District: Howmeh

Population (2016)
  - Total: 498
- Time zone: UTC+3:30 (IRST)

Rezaabad (Persian: رضااباد) (Note: Also romanized as Reẕāābād; also known as Reẕāābād-e Āstāneh) is a village in Howmeh Rural District of the Central District in Shirvan County, North Khorasan province, Iran.

== Demographics ==
=== Population ===
At the time of the 2006 National Census, the village's population was 646 in 149 households. The following census in 2011 counted 576 people in 186 households. The 2016 census measured the population of the village as 498 people in 154 households.
