= Owshen-e Olya =

Village in Isfahan province, Iran

Owshen-e Olya Persian: اوشن عليا
- Village
- Location within Iran
- Coordinates: 32°38′25″N 52°56′32″E
- Country: Iran
- Province: Isfahan
- County: Nain
- District: Central
- Rural District: Lay Siyah

Population (2016)
  - Total: 139
- Time zone: UTC+3:30 (IRST)

Owshen-e Olya (Persian: اوشن عليا) (Note: Also romanized as Owshen-e ‘Olyā; also known as Owshen, Ushan, and Ūshen) is a village in Lay Siyah Rural District of the Central District in Nain County, Isfahan province, Iran.

== Demographics ==
=== Population ===
At the time of the 2006 National Census, the village's population was 124 in 39 households. The following census in 2011 counted 121 people in 38 households. The 2016 census measured the population of the village as 139 people in 54 households.
