= Homaabad-e Olya =

Village in Isfahan province, Iran

Homaabad-e Olya Persian: همااباد عليا
- Village
- Location within Iran
- Coordinates: 32°46′36″N 52°58′39″E
- Country: Iran
- Province: Isfahan
- County: Nain
- District: Central
- Rural District: Lay Siyah

Population (2016)
  - Total: 343
- Time zone: UTC+3:30 (IRST)

Homaabad-e Olya (Persian: همااباد عليا) (Note: Also romanized as Homāābād-e ‘Olyā; also known as Hamābād-e ‘Olyā, Hamamābād, Homāābād-e Bālā, Homābād-e Bālā, Homabad Olya, Homābād-e ‘Olyā, and Humābād Bāla) is a village in, and the capital of, Lay Siyah Rural District in the Central District of Nain County, Isfahan province, Iran.

== Demographics ==
=== Population ===
At the time of the 2006 National Census, the village's population was 239 in 78 households. The following census in 2011 counted 527 people in 185 households. The 2016 census measured the population of the village as 343 people in 126 households, the most populous in its rural district.
