= Sokkeh =

Village in North Khorasan province, Iran

Sokkeh Persian: سكه
- Village
- Location within Iran
- Coordinates: 37°24′32″N 58°05′30″E
- Country: Iran
- Province: North Khorasan
- County: Shirvan
- District: Central
- Rural District: Howmeh

Population (2016)
  - Total: 263
- Time zone: UTC+3:30 (IRST)

Sokkeh (Persian: سكه) (Note: Also known as Sowkad and Sūkkeh (سوكه)) is a village in Howmeh Rural District of the Central District in Shirvan County, North Khorasan province, Iran.

== Demographics ==
=== Population ===
At the time of the 2006 National Census, the village's population was 334 in 108 households. The following census in 2011 counted 333 people in 111 households. The 2016 census measured the population of the village as 263 people in 92 households.
