= Prayag =

Prayag is a historical name of the area near the confluence of the Ganges and Yamuna rivers in the modern-day city of Prayagraj in northern India.

It may also refer to:

== Places ==
=== Localities in Prayagraj ===
- a locality in the city of Prayagraj; the city formerly known as Allahabad before 2019
- Triveni Sangam, the confluence of rivers in Prayagraj, considered sacred in Hinduism
- Prayag Junction, the main railway station in Prayagraj

=== Other places ===
- Panch Prayag, the five river confluences in northern India considered sacred in Hinduism:
  - Vishnuprayag, also spelled Vishnu Prayag, a town at the confluence of the Alaknanda and the Dhauliganga
  - Nandaprayag, also spelled Nand(a) Prayag, a town at the confluence of the Alaknanda and the Nandakini
  - Karnaprayag, also spelled Karna Prayag, a town at the confluence of the Alaknanda and the Pindar
  - Rudraprayag, also spelled Rudra Prayag, a town at the confluence of the Alaknanda and the Mandakini
  - Devprayag, also spelled Dev(a) Prayag, a town at the confluence of the Alaknanda and Bhagirathi
- Prayag Film City, film studios in West Bengal, India

== People ==
- Sandeep Prayag, Mauritian politician
- Prayag Bhati (b. 1991), Indian cricketer
- Prayag Jha (b. 1945), Indian artist specialising in etching
- Prayag Mishra (b. c. 1997–1998), Canadian social media personality

== Other uses ==
- Prayag India, an Indian sanitaryware manufacturer
- United Sports Club, a football club in Calcutta, India, formerly called Prayag United

== See also ==
- Prayagraj (disambiguation)
- Prayag Kumbh Mela, a Hindu festival held in Prayagraj
- Prayag Sangeet Samiti, a music institute in Prayagraj
- Prayagpur, a town in West Bengal, India
