= Kirti Jain =

Indian theatre director (born 1949)

- Born: 11 December 1949 (age 76); Allahabad, Uttar Pradesh, India
- Occupations: Theatre director, Professor
- Parents: Nemi Chandra Jain (father); Rekha Jain (mother)
- Awards: Sangeet Natak Akademi Award (2011)

Kirti Jain (born 11 December 1949) is a theatre director from Prayagraj, India. She is a former director of National School of Drama. She received many awards and honors including the Sangeet Natak Akademi Award for Direction in 2011.

== Biography ==
Kirti Jain was born on 11 December 1949 in Allahabad, Uttar Pradesh, to Nema Chandra Jain, a playwright and writer, and Rekha Jain, a children's playwright.

She completed her M.A. in English literature from Delhi University. She then completed her Diploma in Theatre with specialization in direction from the National School of Drama (1969–1972). She also studied Kathak dance under Maya Rao at the Shriram Bharatiya Kala Kendra, Delhi.

== Career ==
Kirti Jain started her career as a producer at Doordarshan, Delhi in 1972.

Kirti Jain is a trustee of the Natarang Pratishthan, a theatre archives and documentation centre based in Uttar Pradesh. She was a member of the editorial board of Studies in Theatre and Performance, a theatre journal published by the University of Exeter, England, and has contributed essays to the Companion to the Indian Theatre and the Oxford Encyclopedia of Theatre and Performance, published by Oxford University Press.

=== At National School of Drama ===
Kirti was appointed as an associate professor of Indian Theatre History at the National School of Drama in 1977, later becoming a professor of Modern Indian drama and serving as its director from 1988 to 1995. During this period, she started the National School of Drama's Theatre in Education (TIE) programme to promote children's theatre, Documentation and Publishing programmes, and also established the National School of Drama's Regional Research Centre in Bangalore. She also initiated the National School of Drama's collaboration with theatre departments in foreign universities, particularly those in the UK, Poland and Germany.

== Works ==
Her feminist play Aur Kitne Tukde, based on Urvashi Butalia's The Other Side of Silence, which is set during the Partition of India, addresses gender-based violence and patriarchy. Tinka Tinka, a play based on the Gujarat earthquake, was prepared by her with students from NSD, Kaun Thagwa Nagaria Lootal Ho by her is based on a Hindi story by Kashinath Singh. She directed Girish Karnad's Hayavadana with students from Dartington College of Arts in England. Based on the novel of the same name by Ashapurna Devi, Subarnalatha, which tells the story of a woman who struggles against patriarchy and seeks a place of her own throughout her life, was adapted for a play by Geetanjali Sri in 1999 and directed by Kirti Jain. Baghdad Burning (2007), another political drama she directed is based on US invasion of Iraq. The play Kaun Thagwa Nagaria Lootal Ho directed by her is based on globalization and market economy. Hamara Shahar Us Baras which discuss the impact of communal politics is a stage adaptation of Geetanjali Shree's novel with same title. She had also directed Mohan Rakesh's Ashadh Ka Ek Din, Lehron Ke Rajhans, and Mahesh Elkunchwar's Holi.

She is the editor of the book Badal Sircar: Search for a Language of Theatre (ISBN 978-9383098965, Niyogi Books).

== Awards and honors ==
In 2010, for her overall contributions in the field of theatre, Kirti received the B. V. Karanth Smrirti Puraskar. She received the Sangeet Natak Akademi Award for Direction in 2011.
