= Allahabad-e Rezvan =

Allahabad-e Rezvan الله‌آباد رضوان
- Village
- Location within Iran
- Coordinates: 28°32′32″N 57°43′35″E
- Country: Iran
- Province: Kerman
- County: Jiroft
- Bakhsh: Central
- Rural District: Eslamabad

Population (2006)
  - Total: 379
- Time zone: UTC+3:30 (IRST)
  - Summer (DST): UTC+4:30 (IRDT)

Allahabad-e Rezvan (Persian: الله‌آباد رضوان, also Romanized as Allāhābād-e Reẕvān) is a village in Eslamabad Rural District, in the Central District of Jiroft County, Kerman Province, Iran. At the 2006 census, its population was 379, in 101 families.
