= Allahabad, Kerman =

Village in Iran

Allahabad اله اباد
- Village
- Location within Iran
- Coordinates: 30°19′25″N 57°13′25″E
- Country: Iran
- Province: Kerman
- County: Kerman
- Bakhsh: Central
- Rural District: Sar Asiab-e Farsangi

Population (2006)
  - Total: 14
- Time zone: UTC+3:30 (IRST)
  - Summer (DST): UTC+4:30 (IRDT)

Allahabad (Persian: اله اباد, also Romanized as Allāhābād; also known as Deh-e Yāsā’ī) is a village in Sar Asiab-e Farsangi Rural District, in the Central District of Kerman County, Kerman Province, Iran. At the 2006 census, its population was 14, in 4 families.
