= Allahabad, Tiran and Karvan =

Allahabad الله‌آباد
- Village
- Location within Iran
- Coordinates: 32°40′19″N 50°57′54″E
- Country: Iran
- Province: Isfahan
- County: Tiran and Karvan
- Bakhsh: Central
- Rural District: Rezvaniyeh

Population (2006)
  - Total: 89
- Time zone: UTC+3:30 (IRST)
  - Summer (DST): UTC+4:30 (IRDT)

Allahabad (Persian: الله‌آباد, also Romanized as Allāhābād, Alāhābād, and Elāhābād) is a village in Rezvaniyeh Rural District, in the Central District of Tiran and Karvan County, Isfahan Province, Iran. At the 2006 census, its population was 89, in 31 families.
