= Allahabad, Torbat-e Heydarieh =

Allahabad اله اباد
- Village
- Location within Iran
- Coordinates: 35°06′07″N 59°16′25″E
- Country: Iran
- Province: Razavi Khorasan
- County: Torbat-e Heydarieh
- Bakhsh: Central
- Rural District: Pain Velayat

Population (2006)
  - Total: 411
- Time zone: UTC+3:30 (IRST)
  - Summer (DST): UTC+4:30 (IRDT)

Allahabad (Persian: اله اباد, also Romanized as Allāhābād) is a village in Pain Velayat Rural District, in the Central District of Torbat-e Heydarieh County, Razavi Khorasan Province, Iran. As of the 2006 census, its population was 411, in 108 families.

== See also ==
- List of cities, towns and villages in Razavi Khorasan Province
