= Allahabad, Ardestan =

Allahabad الله‌آباد
- Village
- Location within Iran
- Coordinates: 33°10′12″N 52°48′45″E
- Country: Iran
- Province: Isfahan
- County: Ardestan
- Bakhsh: Zavareh
- Rural District: Sofla

Population (2006)
  - Total: 12
- Time zone: UTC+3:30 (IRST)
  - Summer (DST): UTC+4:30 (IRDT)

Allahabad (Persian: الله‌آباد, also Romanized as Allāhābād) is a village in Sofla Rural District, Zavareh District, Ardestan County, Isfahan Province, Iran. At the 2006 census, its population was 12, in 4 families.
