= Shivnath Mishra =

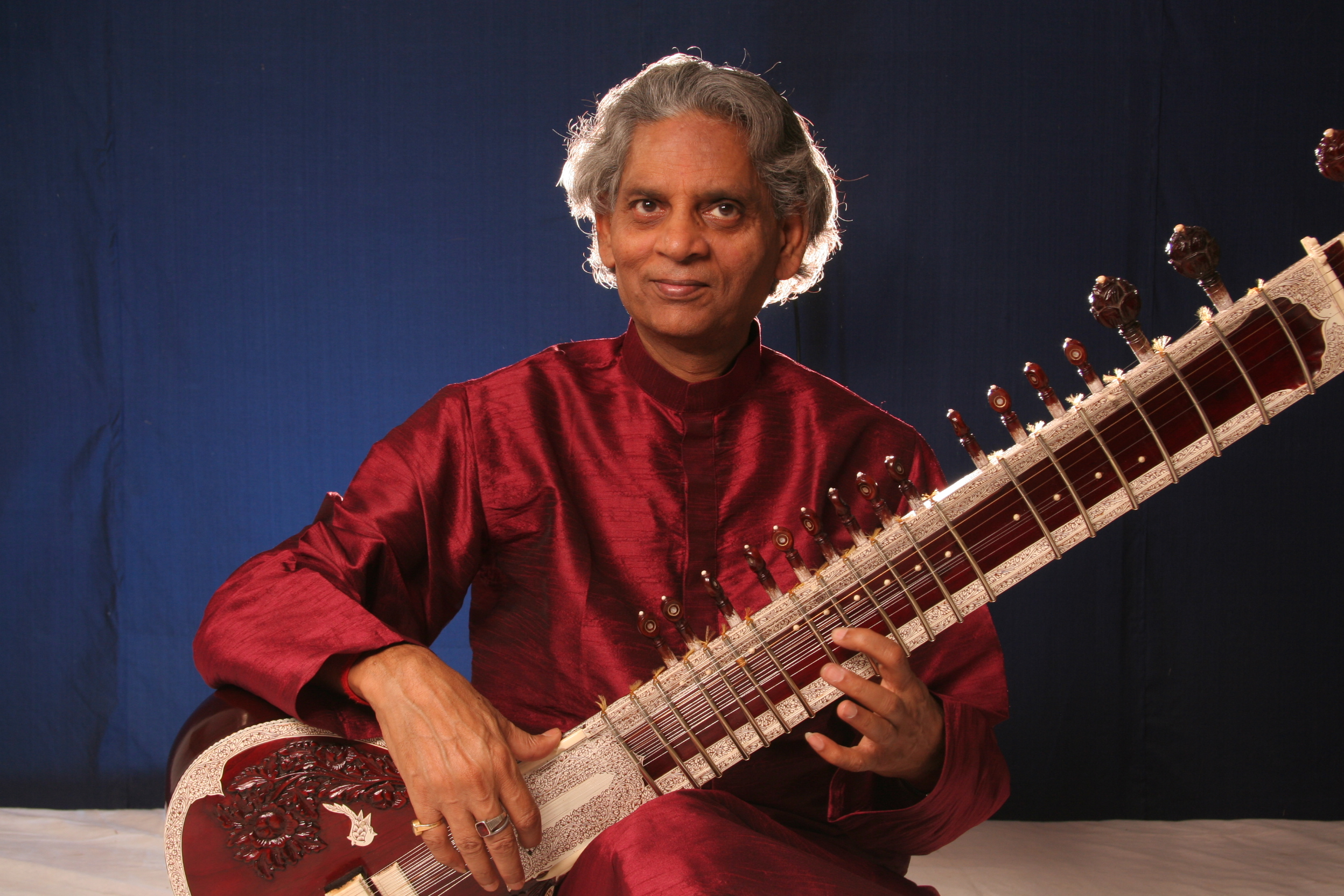
- Shivnath Mishra at his academy in 2007

Background information
- Born: 12 October 1943 (age 83); Benares, Benares State, British India
- Genre: Indian classical music
- Occupation: Sitarist
- Instrument: Sitar
- Labels: T-Series, Soundings of the Planet
- Website: music-of-benares.com

Pandit Shivnath Mishra (born 12 October 1943) is an Indian sitarist. He is an exponent of the Benares Gharana school of Indian classical music. He was formerly a lecturer and the Head of the Music Department at the Sampurnanand Sanskrit University, Varanasi. He was awarded the Padma Shri in 2022, by the Government of India.

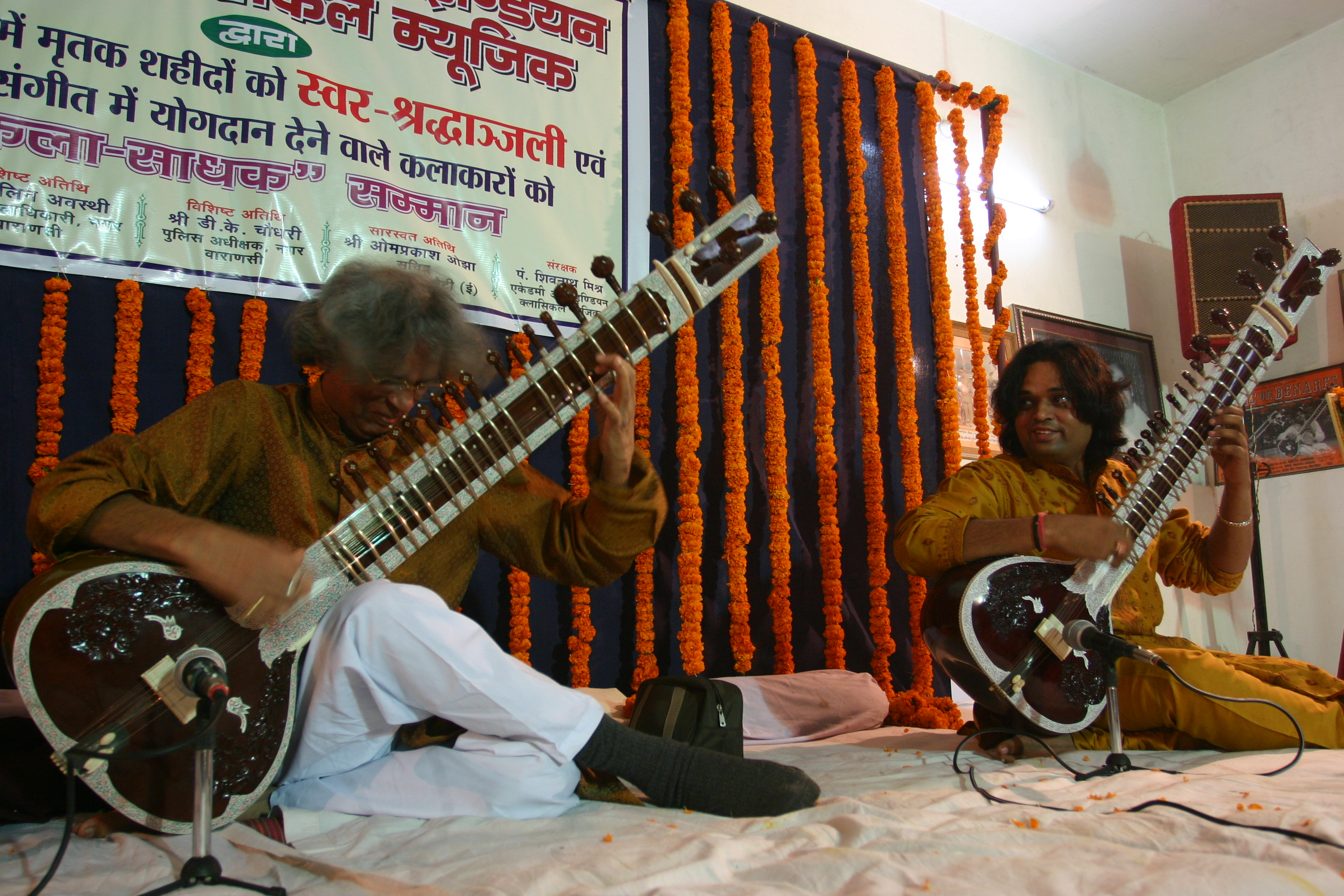
Pt. Shivnath and Deobrat Mishra performing at a charity event for victims of 26/11 terrorist attacks on Mumbai in Varanasi on 20 January 2009

== Discography ==
- Sound of Sitar
- Soul of Sitar
- Sitar Jugalbandi: Live in Milan
- Raag Desh: Monsoon Raga (2002)
- Joy (2003)
- Raga Cycle (2004)
- Rare Instruments: Surbahar - Pandit Shivnath & Deobrat Mihsra (ASA Music)

== Awards and accolades ==
- Shivnath Mishra was awarded the title of Padma Shri in 2022. He is the only Sitar player from Varanasi to have received Padma Shri Award after Ravi Shankar
- Shivnath Mishra was awarded the Uttar Pradesh Sangeet Natak Akademi Award in 2004
