= Allahabad, Nain =

Village in Isfahan province, Iran

Allahabad Persian: الله اباد
- Village
- Location within Iran
- Coordinates: 32°41′33″N 52°58′30″E
- Country: Iran
- Province: Isfahan
- County: Nain
- District: Central
- Rural District: Lay Siyah

Population (2016)
  - Total: 116
- Time zone: UTC+3:30 (IRST)

Allahabad (Persian: الله‌آباد) (Note: Also romanized as Allāhābād) is a village in Lay Siyah Rural District of the Central District in Nain County, Isfahan province, Iran.

== Demographics ==
=== Population ===
At the time of the 2006 National Census, the village's population was 122 in 37 households. The following census in 2011 counted 121 people in 42 households. The 2016 census measured the population of the village as 116 people in 42 households.
