= Allahabad-e Jahangir Khan =

Allahabad-e Jahangir Khan الله‌آباد جهانگیر خان
- Village
- Location within Iran
- Coordinates: 28°24′13″N 57°49′58″E
- Country: Iran
- Province: Kerman
- County: Anbarabad
- Bakhsh: Central
- Rural District: Aliabad

Population (2006)
  - Total: 287
- Time zone: UTC+3:30 (IRST)
  - Summer (DST): UTC+4:30 (IRDT)

Allahabad-e Jahangir Khan (Persian: الله‌آباد جهانگیر خان, also Romanized as Allāhābād-e Jahāngīr Khān; also known as Allāhābād) is a village in Aliabad Rural District, in the Central District of Anbarabad County, Kerman Province, Iran. At the 2006 census, its population was 287, in 56 families.
