= Allahabad, Lalehzar =

Allahabad الله‌آباد
- Village
- Location within Iran
- Coordinates: 29°38′17″N 56°39′07″E
- Country: Iran
- Province: Kerman
- County: Bardsir
- Bakhsh: Lalehzar
- Rural District: Qaleh Asgar

Population (2006)
  - Total: 16
- Time zone: UTC+3:30 (IRST)
  - Summer (DST): UTC+4:30 (IRDT)

Allahabad (Persian: الله‌آباد, also Romanized as Allāhābād) is a village in Qaleh Asgar Rural District, Lalehzar District, Bardsir County, Kerman Province, Iran. At the 2006 census, its population was 16, in 4 families.
