= Allahabad-e Seyyed =

Allahabad-e Seyyed الله‌آباد سید
- Village
- Location within Iran
- Coordinates: 28°31′08″N 57°44′05″E
- Country: Iran
- Province: Kerman
- County: Jiroft
- Bakhsh: Central
- Rural District: Eslamabad

Population (2006)
  - Total: 269
- Time zone: UTC+3:30 (IRST)
  - Summer (DST): UTC+4:30 (IRDT)

Allahabad-e Seyyed (Persian: الله‌آباد سید, also Romanized as Allāhābād-e Seyyed) is a village in Eslamabad Rural District, in the Central District of Jiroft County, Kerman Province, Iran. At the 2006 census, its population was 269, in 54 families.
