= Prayag India =

Indian manufacturing company

- Type: Private
- Industry: Polymer
- Founded: 1986
- Founder: V.K. Aggarwal
- Headquarters: New Delhi, India
- Area served: India

Prayag India, founded in 1986, is an Indian manufacturer and distributor of sanitary ware products and bathroom accessories. It is the first company in India to use PTMT SYMET ("Polytetra Methylene Terapathalate") technology at production scale. Its product range contains 2500 sanitary ware products such as showers, kitchen sinks, taps, faucets, door handles, etc. Prayag's manufacturing facility is located in Bhiwadi with an area spreading over 15,000 square metres.

Prayag's primary market has been government institutions like Indian Railways, NTPC, BHEL, ONGC, BSNL etc. Aditi Arya, Miss India World 2015 winner, has been the brand ambassador for Prayag India since 2015.

Prayag has also sponsored several Cricket cups, most notably 2015 Prayag Cup for India vs Zimbabwe. It also has been an official sponsor for IPL team Kings XI Punjab in 2012.
