= Allahabad-e Tabatbayi =

Allahabad-e Tabatbayi اله ابادطباطبايي
- Village
- Location within Iran
- Coordinates: 28°56′36″N 58°38′13″E
- Country: Iran
- Province: Kerman
- County: Narmashir
- Bakhsh: Central
- Rural District: Posht Rud

Population (2006)
  - Total: 291
- Time zone: UTC+3:30 (IRST)
  - Summer (DST): UTC+4:30 (IRDT)

Allahabad-e Tabatbayi (Persian: اله ابادطباطبايي, also Romanized as Allāhābād-e Ţabāṭbāyī; also known as Allāhābād) is a village in Posht Rud Rural District, in the Central District of Narmashir County, Kerman Province, Iran. At the 2006 census, its population was 291, in 61 families.
