= Allahabad-e Do =

Allahabad-e Do الله‌آباد ۲
- Village
- Location within Iran
- Coordinates: 28°52′09″N 59°06′03″E
- Country: Iran
- Province: Kerman
- County: Fahraj
- Bakhsh: Negin Kavir
- Rural District: Chahdegal

Population (2006)
  - Total: 157
- Time zone: UTC+3:30 (IRST)
  - Summer (DST): UTC+4:30 (IRDT)

Allahabad-e Do (Persian: الله‌آباد ۲, also Romanized as Allahābād-e Do; also known as Allahābād) is a village in Chahdegal Rural District, Negin Kavir District, Fahraj County, Kerman Province, Iran. At the 2006 census, its population was 157, in 30 families.
