= Allahabad-e Hajjiabad =

Allahabad-e Hajjiabad الله‌آباد حاجی‌آباد
- Village
- Country: Iran
- Province: Kerman
- County: Fahraj
- Bakhsh: Negin Kavir
- Rural District: Chahdegal

Population (2006)
  - Total: 294
- Time zone: UTC+3:30 (IRST)
  - Summer (DST): UTC+4:30 (IRDT)

Allahabad-e Hajjiabad (Persian: الله‌آباد حاجی‌آباد, also Romanized as Allahābād-e Ḩājjīābād) is a village in Chahdegal Rural District, Negin Kavir District, Fahraj County, Kerman Province, Iran. At the 2006 census, its population was 294, in 67 families.
