= Allahabad, Iranshahr =

Allahabad اله اباد
- Village
- Location within Iran
- Coordinates: 27°12′03″N 60°28′49″E
- Country: Iran
- Province: Sistan and Baluchestan
- County: Iranshahr
- Bakhsh: Central
- Rural District: Howmeh

Population (2006)
  - Total: 1,619
- Time zone: UTC+3:30 (IRST)
  - Summer (DST): UTC+4:30 (IRDT)

Allahabad (Persian: اله اباد, also Romanized as Allāhābād) is a village in Howmeh Rural District, in the Central District of Iranshahr County, Sistan and Baluchestan Province, Iran. At the 2006 census, its population was 1,619, in 384 families.
