= Allahabad-e Sofla, North Khorasan =

Allahabad-e Sofla اله ابادسفلي
- Village
- Location within Iran
- Coordinates: 37°24′06″N 58°01′34″E
- Country: Iran
- Province: North Khorasan
- County: Shirvan
- Bakhsh: Central
- Rural District: Howmeh

Population (2006)
  - Total: 218
- Time zone: UTC+3:30 (IRST)
  - Summer (DST): UTC+4:30 (IRDT)

Allahabad-e Sofla (Persian: اله ابادسفلي, also Romanized as Allāhābād-e Soflá; also known as Allāhābād-e Pā’īn and Allāh Ābād) is a village in Howmeh Rural District, in the Central District of Shirvan County, North Khorasan Province, Iran. At the 2006 census, its population was 218, in 60 families.
