= Allahabad, Tehran =

Allahabad اله اباد
- village
- Location within Iran
- Coordinates: 35°33′39″N 50°39′19″E
- Country: Iran
- Province: Tehran
- County: Malard
- Bakhsh: Central
- Rural District: Akhtarabad

Population (2006)
  - Total: 107
- Time zone: UTC+3:30 (IRST)
  - Summer (DST): UTC+4:30 (IRDT)

Allahabad (Persian: اله اباد, also Romanized as Allāhābād) is a village in Akhtarabad Rural District, in the Central District of Malard County, Tehran Province, Iran. At the 2006 census, its population was 107, in 31 families.
