= Allahabad, Balochistan =

Allahabad الہ آباد
- Village
- Country: Pakistan
- Region: Balochistan
- District: Lasbela District
- Time zone: UTC+5 (PST)

Allahabad is a village and union council of Hub Tehsil in the Lasbela District of Balochistan province, Pakistan.
