= Allahabad, Sindh =

Allahabad
- Location within Pakistan
- Coordinates: 26°53′30″N 67°45′0″E
- Country: Pakistan

Allahabad is a town of Nawabshah District in the southern Sindh province of Pakistan. It is located at 26°53'30N 67°45'0E.
