= Howmeh Rural District (Shirvan County) =

Rural district in North Khorasan province, Iran

Howmeh Rural District Persian: دهستان حومه
- Rural District
- Location within Iran
- Coordinates: 37°22′N 58°02′E
- Country: Iran
- Province: North Khorasan
- County: Shirvan
- District: Central
- Established: 1987
- Capital: Amirabad

Population (2016)
  - Total: 7,070
- Time zone: UTC+3:30 (IRST)

Howmeh Rural District (Persian: دهستان حومه) is in the Central District of Shirvan County, North Khorasan province, Iran. Its capital is the village of Amirabad. The previous capital of the rural district was the village of Allahabad-e Olya.

== Demographics ==
=== Population ===
At the time of the 2006 National Census, the rural district's population was 7,297 in 1,989 households. There were 8,062 inhabitants in 2,285 households at the following census of 2011. The 2016 census measured the population of the rural district as 7,070 in 2,216 households. The most populous of its 31 villages was Chalu, with 1,846 people.

=== Other villages in the rural district ===
- Baghan
- Borzolabad
- Devin
- Hesar-e Devin
- Qalandarabad
- Rezaabad
- Sokkeh
- Yasrabad
