= Allahabad-e Yek =

Allahabad-e Yek الله‌آباد ۱
- Village
- Location within Iran
- Coordinates: 28°48′28″N 59°09′52″E
- Country: Iran
- Province: Kerman
- County: Fahraj
- Bakhsh: Negin Kavir
- Rural District: Chahdegal

Population (2006)
  - Total: 180
- Time zone: UTC+3:30 (IRST)
  - Summer (DST): UTC+4:30 (IRDT)

Allahabad-e Yek (Persian: الله‌آباد ۱, also Romanized as Allahābād-e Yek; also known as Allahābād) is a village in Chahdegal Rural District, Negin Kavir District, Fahraj County, Kerman Province, Iran. At the 2006 census, its population was 180, in 40 families.
