= Allahabad-e Dehqani =

Allahabad-e Dehqani الله‌آباد دهقانی
- Village
- Location within Iran
- Coordinates: 28°30′26″N 57°44′26″E
- Country: Iran
- Province: Kerman
- County: Anbarabad
- Bakhsh: Esmaili
- Rural District: Hoseynabad

Population (2006)
  - Total: 485
- Time zone: UTC+3:30 (IRST)
  - Summer (DST): UTC+4:30 (IRDT)

Allahabad-e Dehqani (Persian: الله‌آباد دهقانی, also Romanized as Allāhābād-e Dehqānī) is a village in Hoseynabad Rural District, Esmaili District, Anbarabad County, Kerman Province, Iran. At the 2006 census, its population was 485, in 91 families.
