= Allahabad-e Mostowfi =

Allahabad-e Mostowfi الله‌آباد مستوفی
- Village
- Location within Iran
- Coordinates: 28°53′42″N 58°48′30″E
- Country: Iran
- Province: Kerman
- County: Fahraj
- Bakhsh: Central
- Rural District: Borj-e Akram

Population (2006)
  - Total: 455
- Time zone: UTC+3:30 (IRST)
  - Summer (DST): UTC+4:30 (IRDT)

Allahabad-e Mostowfi (Persian: الله‌آباد مستوفی, also romanized as Allāhābād-e Mostowfī; also known as Allāhābād) is a village in Borj-e Akram Rural District, in the Central District of Fahraj County, Kerman Province, Iran. At the 2006 census, its population was 455, in 111 families.
