= Allahabad-e Abu Saidi =

Allahabad-e Abu Saidi الله‌آباد ابوسعیدی
- Village
- Location within Iran
- Coordinates: 28°14′29″N 57°36′42″E
- Country: Iran
- Province: Kerman
- County: Anbarabad
- Bakhsh: Esmaili
- Rural District: Esmaili

Population (2006)
  - Total: 469
- Time zone: UTC+3:30 (IRST)
  - Summer (DST): UTC+4:30 (IRDT)

Allahabad-e Abu Saidi (Persian: الله‌آباد ابوسعیدی, also Romanized as Allāhābād-e Abū Sa‘īdī, and Allahābād-e Abū Sa‘īdī, Allah Abad Aboosa’idi, and Allahābād Abū Sa‘īdī; also known as Allāhābād) is a village in Esmaili Rural District, Esmaili District, Anbarabad County, Kerman Province, Iran. At the 2006 census, its population was 469, in 92 families.
