= Deh-e Gowd, Anbarabad =

Deh-e Gowd ده گود
- Village
- Location within Iran
- Coordinates: 28°15′21″N 57°42′03″E
- Country: Iran
- Province: Kerman
- County: Anbarabad
- Bakhsh: Esmaili
- Rural District: Ganjabad

Population (2006)
  - Total: 94
- Time zone: UTC+3:30 (IRST)
  - Summer (DST): UTC+4:30 (IRDT)

Deh-e Gowd (Persian: ده گود) is a village in Ganjabad Rural District, Esmaili District, Anbarabad County, Kerman Province, Iran. At the 2006 census, its population was 94, in 20 families.
