= Deh Gowd, Qaleh Ganj =

Deh Gowd ده گود
- Village
- Location within Iran
- Coordinates: 27°38′53″N 58°08′26″E
- Country: Iran
- Province: Kerman
- County: Qaleh Ganj
- Bakhsh: Central
- Rural District: Sorkh Qaleh

Population (2006)
  - Total: 137
- Time zone: UTC+3:30 (IRST)
  - Summer (DST): UTC+4:30 (IRDT)

Deh Gowd (Persian: ده گود, also Romanized as Dehgowd) is a village in Sorkh Qaleh Rural District, in the Central District of Qaleh Ganj County, Kerman Province, Iran. At the 2006 census, its population was 137, in 41 families.
