= Hashim Raza Allahabadi Abdi =

Indian politician

Member of Rajya Sabha
- In office 03 April 1982 – 02 April 1988
- Constituency: Uttar Pradesh

Personal details
- Born: Hashim Raza Allahabadi Abdi; 18 February 1929
- Died: 13 October 1989 (aged 60)
- Party: Congress (I)
- Spouse: Gohar Abdi

Hashim Raza Allahabadi Abdi (1929–1989) was an Indian politician. He was a Member of Parliament, representing Uttar Pradesh in the Rajya Sabha the upper house of India's Parliament as a member of the Congress (I) He was also member of Uttar Pradesh Legislative Council from 1976 to 1982.
