= Allahabad-e Sofla, Kerman =

Allahabad-e Sofla الله‌آباد سفلی
- Village
- Location within Iran
- Coordinates: 28°31′05″N 57°44′07″E
- Country: Iran
- Province: Kerman
- County: Anbarabad
- Bakhsh: Esmaili
- Rural District: Hoseynabad

Population (2006)
  - Total: 451
- Time zone: UTC+3:30 (IRST)
  - Summer (DST): UTC+4:30 (IRDT)

Allahabad-e Sofla (Persian: الله‌آباد سفلی, also Romanized as Allahābād-e Soflá; also known as Allahābād-e Pā’īn) is a village in Hoseynabad Rural District, Esmaili District, Anbarabad County, Kerman Province, Iran. At the 2006 census, its population was 451, in 107 families.
