= Prayag Mishra =

Canadian content creator and actor

- Born: 1997 or 1998 (age 28–29); South Delhi, India
- Occupations: Content creator; actor
- Years active: 2021–present

Instagram information
- Page: Prayag
- Years active: 2015–present
- Followers: 836 thousand

TikTok information
- Page: Prayag
- Years active: 2021–present
- Followers: 4 million
- Last updated: 20 September 2026

Prayag Mishra is an Indian-born content creator and actor based in Toronto. He became known in September 2023 for TikTok videos filmed in his car, in which he speaks to the camera as if talking to a partner he calls "Pookie." His follower count grew from about 29,000 to several million within weeks, and media outlets described him as a leading figure in the "sassy man" trend. In 2026 he made his television acting debut in the third season of the Crave series Late Bloomer.

== Early life ==
Mishra was born in South Delhi and lives in Toronto. His family moved to the United States during the 2008 financial crisis and settled in Canada in 2011. He studied business management in college.

Before creating content full time, Mishra worked in sales, including door-to-door sales of fiber optic services and later corporate sales. He told the Toronto Star that he worked in the technology sector for four years. He lost his job in 2022 and began posting online more often afterward.

== Career ==
=== Social media ===
Mishra started posting on TikTok at age 23. For about two years he built an audience of roughly 29,000 followers. His videos were filmed from the front seat of his car. He addressed the camera as if he were on a video call with a partner he called "Pookie," and he later called his followers "Pookie Nation" or "Pookie bears." Mishra told Complex that the format began as a way to have someone to talk to during a period when he was spending time alone.

A video he posted on September 23, 2023, ended with the line "It's the way you act." It received more than 5.3 million likes, according to the Toronto Star. The Los Angeles Times described it as a dance tutorial for the "Wassup Gway" trend. Mishra reached 100,000 followers on September 27 and one million about eleven days later. By October 17 he had 2.5 million followers, and by early November the Star reported 4.3 million. In January 2024 Complex reported that he had 5.1 million followers on TikTok and 1.3 million on Instagram. The Star reported that his audience was 92 percent female and mostly Generation Z. The Queen's Journal, a student newspaper at Queen's University, wrote that the word "pookie" began trending mainly because of Mishra.

In October 2023, TikTok briefly banned Mishra's account after he filmed a video for the TikTok account of People. It was restored about 25 hours later. His fans made videos asking for his return and started a Change.org petition. Mishra said he believed the ban was caused by the speed of his growth, at about 100,000 followers every eight hours. TikTok did not respond to People when asked for comment.

=== "Sassy man" trend ===
The phrase "sassy man apocalypse" first appeared on Twitter in 2022, according to NBC News. It was first used as an insult, often with homophobic overtones, for men considered effeminate. In 2023 it became a TikTok trend in which women posted videos of their boyfriends' mannerisms, and many of these videos presented the behavior as endearing. The Los Angeles Times and NBC News identified Mishra as a face of the trend, and the Star contrasted it with the "manosphere." Mishra accepted the label. He told Complex that his idea of masculinity did not depend on speaking in a deeper voice or sounding mature.

Some commentators questioned how much the trend could change. Brandon Harris, a communication professor at the University of Houston–Clear Lake who studies toxic masculinity among online creators, told NBC News that Mishra had branded himself as challenging masculinity, but that one creator posting from a car could not be expected to solve the problem. Iyosias Wondwossen, a creator described as one of the early "sassy men," called it a "minor sassy movement" that was unlikely to change social expectations of masculinity much.

=== Acting and other work ===
Mishra told Complex in 2024 that he had done short films and commercials before going viral and wanted to work in acting. As of 2026 he had traveled for brand campaigns, shot commercials in London and attended the premiere of The Ba***ds of Bollywood (2025).

Mishra plays Prem in the third season of the Crave comedy-drama Late Bloomer, which began streaming on April 24, 2026. The role was his television acting debut. According to Vogue India, the character's personality is close to Mishra's online persona. CBC Arts describes Prem as a younger and more chronically online video creator.

== Filmography ==
Year	Title	Role	Ref.
2026	Late Bloomer	Prem	
