= Allahabad (ship) =

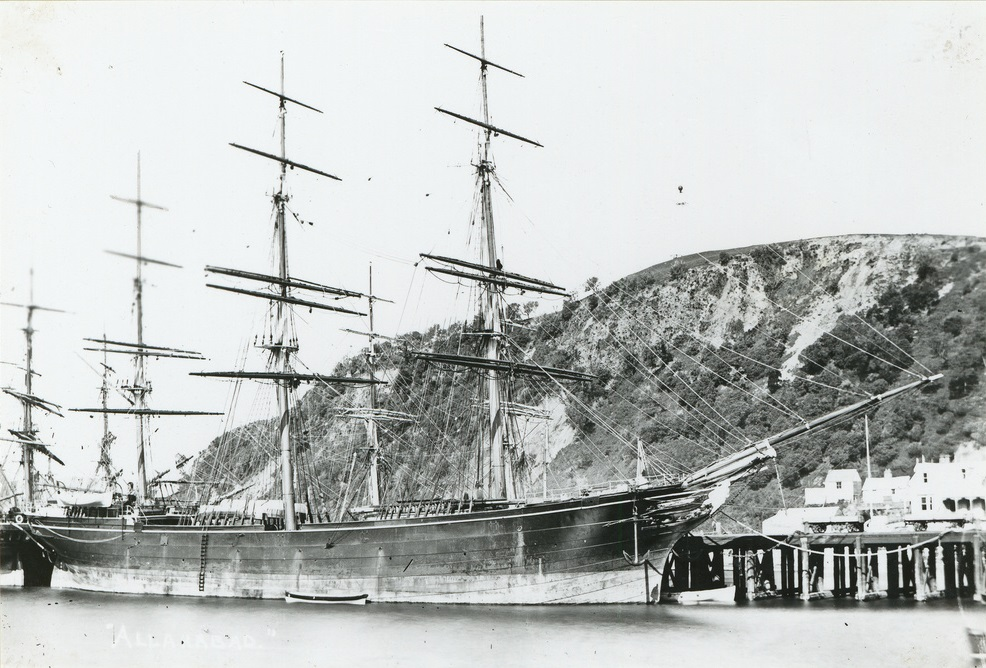

History
- Name: Allahabad
- Owner: Thomas Wall Stephens
- Builder: Liverpool
- Completed: 1864
- Fate: Disappeared in 1886

General characteristics
- Tonnage: 1,190 GRT; 1,143 NRT

Allahabad was an iron-hulled full-rigged ship, built in Liverpool in 1864. She was later re-rigged as a barque and disappeared in 1886 on a voyage from Scotland to New Zealand.

== Construction and service ==
Allahabad was launched on 19 September 1864 by W H Potter & Company in Liverpool, as an iron full-rigged ship of 1,185 registered tons. She had a length of 205.6 feet (62.7 m), a beam of 34.7 feet (10.6 m), and she had a 22.5-foot (6.9 m) depth. The ship was built for the shipowner James Baines & Co. of Liverpool and began her maiden voyage from there, to Calcutta, on 10 December 1864.

In 1877 she was re-rigged as a barque and re-measured as 1,191 tons gross and 1,143 net register tons. At the time of her loss she was the property of Thomas Wall Stephens of London and him being the managing owner.

== Loss ==
Allahabad last left Glasgow on 2 July 1886, with a crew of 20 and a cargo of 1,712 tons, of which 1,635 was coal, bound to Dunedin, New Zealand. Having been signalled on 7 July off the Tuskar, she was on 4 September following, spoken, in about 29°S 28°W by the ship South Australian. From that time she has not been seen or heard of, and never arrived at her destination.
