= Allahabad-e Olya, Kerman =

Allahabad-e Olya الله‌آباد علیا
- Village
- Location within Iran
- Coordinates: 28°32′45″N 57°44′28″E
- Country: Iran
- Province: Kerman
- County: Anbarabad
- Bakhsh: Esmaili
- Rural District: Hoseynabad

Population (2006)
  - Total: 874
- Time zone: UTC+3:30 (IRST)
  - Summer (DST): UTC+4:30 (IRDT)

Allahabad-e Olya (Persian: الله‌آباد علیا, also Romanized as Allāhābād-e ‘Olyā; also known as Allāhābād-e Bālā) is a village in Hoseynabad Rural District, Esmaili District, Anbarabad County, Kerman Province, Iran. At the 2006 census, its population was 874, in 181 families.
