= Allahabad-e Olya, North Khorasan =

Village in North Khorasan province, Iran

Allahabad-e Olya Persian: اله اباد عليا
- Village
- Location within Iran
- Coordinates: 37°24′52″N 58°01′24″E
- Country: Iran
- Province: North Khorasan
- County: Shirvan
- District: Central
- Rural District: Howmeh

Population (2016)
  - Total: 454
- Time zone: UTC+3:30 (IRST)

Allahabad-e Olya (Persian: اله ابادعليا) (Note: Also romanized as Allāhābād-e ‘Olyā; also known as Allāhābād-e Bālā) is a village in, and the former capital of, Howmeh Rural District in the Central District of Shirvan County, North Khorasan province, Iran. The capital of the rural district has been transferred to the village of Amirabad.

== Demographics ==
=== Population ===
At the time of the 2006 National Census, the village's population was 673 in 188 households. The following census in 2011 counted 611 people in 200 households. The 2016 census measured the population of the village as 454 people in 158 households.
