= Deh-e Gowd, Rudbar-e Jonubi =

Deh-e Gowd ده گود
- Village
- Location within Iran
- Coordinates: 27°56′08″N 58°26′00″E
- Country: Iran
- Province: Kerman
- County: Rudbar-e Jonubi
- Bakhsh: Jazmurian
- Rural District: Jazmurian

Population (2006)
  - Total: 413
- Time zone: UTC+3:30 (IRST)
  - Summer (DST): UTC+4:30 (IRDT)

Deh-e Gowd (Persian: ده گود, also Romanized as Deh Gowd; also known as Allāhābād, Deh-e Gowdāl, Deh Goo, Deh-i-Gāv, and Deh Ka’ū) is a village in Jazmurian Rural District, Jazmurian District, Rudbar-e Jonubi County, Kerman Province, Iran. At the 2006 census, its population was 413, in 92 families.
