= Vishal Misra =

American engineer

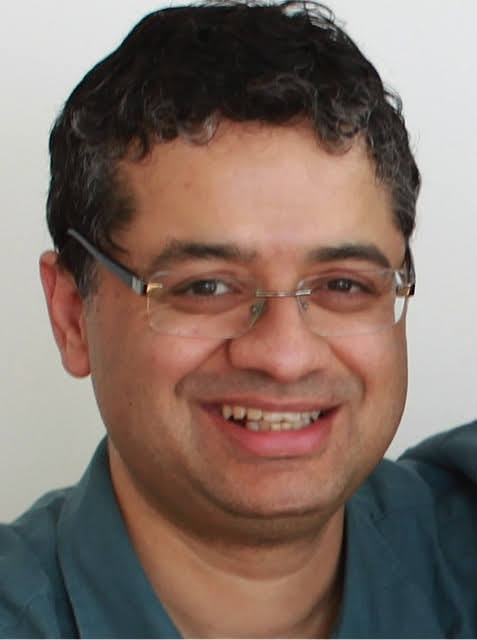
- Vishal Misra
- Born: Bhopal, India
- Citizenship: US
- Occupations: Professor, Entrepreneur
- Awards: ACM Fellow, IEEE Fellow

Academic background
- Education: IIT Bombay, UMass-Amherst

Academic work
- Discipline: Computer Scientist
- Institutions: Columbia University
- Website: https://www.cs.columbia.edu/~misra/

Vishal Misra is an Indian-American computer scientist at Columbia University, New York, NY. He serves as Professor in the Computer Science and Electrical Engineering departments and as Vice Dean of Computing and AI at Columbia's School of Engineering. He was named Fellow of the Institute of Electrical and Electronics Engineers (IEEE) in 2016 for his contributions to network traffic modeling, congestion control, and Internet economics. He was elected as an ACM Fellow in 2018. In 2014, he received the Distinguished Young Alumnus Award from the University of Massachusetts Amherst School of Engineering, and in 2019, he was designated a Distinguished Alumnus of IIT Bombay, from which he graduated in 1992.

== Research Contributions ==
His research has significantly impacted internet infrastructure and design. Misra developed the first stochastic differential equation (fluid) model of TCP, which enabled formal control theoretic analysis of Internet congestion control mechanisms. This work influenced Cisco's development of the PIE (Proportional Integral controller Enhanced) algorithm, which addresses the bufferbloat problem in internet networks. The PIE controller has been incorporated into the DOCSIS 3.1 standard for cable internet.

== Sports Technology Career ==
Misra's involvement in sports technology spans nearly three decades. In 1993, he co-founded ESPNcricinfo (originally Cricinfo), which became the world's leading cricket website. There, he designed and implemented the first live sports scorecard system on the Internet, revolutionizing online sports coverage.

Since 2013, he has served as an advisor to Dream Sports, the parent company of Dream11, India's leading fantasy sports platform. This relationship led to the establishment of the Columbia-Dream Sports AI Innovation Center, where he serves as Director. The center brings together Columbia University and Dream Sports to advance research and workforce development in sports technology.

In professional cricket, he holds the position of Dean of Cricket Analytics for the San Francisco Unicorns in Major League Cricket, where together with a team he develops cutting-edge data analytics tools that are utilized by both the Unicorns and professional teams in Australia's Big Bash League.

== Artificial Intelligence and Entrepreneurial Ventures ==
In 2021, Misra founded Ask Here First, which developed AskCricinfo, one of the earliest commercial applications of Large Language Models (LLMs). Launched on ESPNcricinfo on September 15, 2021, fifteen months before ChatGPT's release, AskCricinfo pioneered the commercial implementation of Retrieval Augmented Generation (RAG) technology. The system creates a natural language interface for Statsguru, ESPNcricinfo's comprehensive cricket statistics database, allowing users to query cricket statistics using everyday language.

In 2011, he founded Infinio, a company specializing in data center storage solutions.

== Internet Policy and Net Neutrality ==
Misra has been influential in shaping network neutrality policy, particularly in India. His definition of net neutrality was adopted by citizen advocacy groups and ultimately influenced India's regulatory framework, which was recognized as implementing the world's strongest net neutrality protections.

== Media and Public Engagement ==
Misra was interviewed on Saqib Ali's Cricket Podcast, where he explained his journey with ESPNcricinfo in terms of how he built up their stats-based search feature and its latest version of Natural-language based search. He also spoke about the importance of Stats in the way cricket is consumed, and the importance of democratisation of stats in cricket.
