= Ramakant Mishra =

Ramakant Mishra (13 May 1931 – 8 September 2011) was an IAS officer and renowned scholar. He was the fourth son of Umesh Mishra, the first Vice-Chancellor of Kameshwar Singh Sanskrit University, Darbhanga. He died of a heart attack in New Delhi.

An officer of the Uttar Pradesh cadre, pal rose into prominence with his appointment as the first Chief Executive Officer of Kashi Vishwanath Temple in 1983 when the temple was taken over by the Uttar Pradesh government. The government had decided to take control of the temple after an incident of theft. Mishra retired in 1993 but continued to contribute to the temple traditions in various ways for many years to follow.

Mishra was widely known as an authority on Hindu religion and philosophy. In his post-retirement years Mishra served on the management boards of various institutions of national repute like Bharatiya Vidya Bhavan and Harish Chandra Institute of Atomic Energy.

Stressing the importance of Dharma in human life he also authored a book titled “Sandhyopasan Vidhi”, dealing with the karmakand of the Hindu society.
