= Uttar Pradesh Sangeet Natak Akademi Award =

Uttar Pradesh Sangeet Natak Akademi is a key branch of the Uttar Pradesh state government's Department of Culture. Each year the Academy Awards for excellence in performance of music, art and literature are awarded at the Uttar Pradesh Sangeet Natak Akademi.

== Academy Award ==
The award trophy, shawl and including Rs 10,000 are given in this award.

== The list of awardees ==
2001

1. Aarushi Gupta, Kathak (New Delhi)

=== 2003 ===
1. Afzal Hossain Khan: Classical music (Kanpur)
2. Gulshan Bharti, light music (Lucknow)
3. Iqbal Ahmed Siddiqui, light music (Lucknow)
4. Pandit Krishna Mohan Mishra, Kathak (Lucknow)
5. Pandit Kumar Lal Mishra, tabla playing (Varanasi)
6. Pandit Avdesh Kumar Dwivedi pakhawaj recital (Banda)
7. Padma Gidwani, folk singing (Lucknow)
8. Atamjit Singh, acting (Lucknow)
9. Anil Singh Bhowmick, theater directing (Allahabad)
10. Pandit Arjun Mishra, Kathak (Lucknow)
11. Amarnath Mishra, sitar (Varanasi)

=== 2004 ===
1. Pandit Shivnath Mishra, sitar (Varanasi)
2. Pandit Ram Mohan Maharaj Kathak (Delhi)
3. Girish Chandra Srivastava, tabla playing (Allahabad)
4. Ramji Lal Sharma Pakhawaj recital (Rampur)
5. Vimal Pant, folk singing (Lucknow)
6. Reena Tandon, folk singing (Lucknow)
7. Atul Tiwari, theatrical direction, (Lucknow)
8. Chittaranjan Jyotisha, classical singing (Varanasi)
9. Kajal Sharma, Kathak (Agra)
10. Malini Awasthi, folk singing (Lucknow)
11. Jugul Kishor, acting, (Lucknow) (posthumous)

=== 2005 ===
1. Pandit Brij Bhushan Goswami, Dhrupad, (Delhi)
2. Ram Kumar Chatterjee, intelligible voices (Lucknow)
3. V. Balaji, violin, (Varanasi)
4. Urmila Sharma, Kathak (Allahabad)
5. Pandit Madan Mohan Upadhyay, tabla playing (Lucknow)
6. Dinesh Prasad Pakhawaj recital (Lucknow)
7. Parshuram Yadav, folk singing, (Ballia)
8. Asha Dhasmana, acting (Lucknow)
9. Pokria Lalit Singh (Lucknow)
10. Mridula Bhardwaj, acting (Lucknow)
11. Chitra Mohan, theatrical director (Lucknow)

=== 2006 ===
1. Pandit Vinod Kumar Dwivedi, Dhrupad, (Kanpur)
2. Pandit Santosh Kumar Mishra, violin recital (Varanasi)
3. Renu Srivastava, Kathak (Lucknow)
4. Ravinath Pandit Mishra, tabla playing (Lucknow)
5. Meenu Khare, folk singing (Lucknow)
6. MN Gujjar, acting (Varanasi)
7. Sandhya Rastogi, acting (Lucknow)
8. Haider Baksh, Qawwali singing, (Lucknow)
9. Gopal Sinha, Rngdipan (Lucknow)
10. H Basant, music composition (Lucknow)
11. Hari Prasad Singh, folk upgrades (Gorakhpur)

=== 2007 ===
1. Sudhir Narayan, light music (Agra)
2. Poonam Nigam, Kathak (Lucknow)
3. Shobha Kudesia, tabla playing (Aligarh)
4. Vikram Bisht, folk singing (Lucknow)
5. JP Singh, writing dance (Ghaziabad)
6. Rakesh Sinha, classical shading (Lucknow)
7. Achala Bose, acting (Lucknow)
8. Kewal Kumar, music composition (Lucknow)
9. Pradeep Tripathi, puppet (Lucknow)
10. Arun Kumar Bhatt, tabla playing (Lucknow)
11. Kamala, Rang music (Lucknow)

=== 2008 ===
1. Hari Mohan Srivastava, flute solo (Lucknow)
2. Rajiv Shukla, tabla playing (Lucknow)
3. Atul Yaduvanshi, Folk Theatre Nautanki (Allahabad)
4. Yatindra Mishra, writing-music (Ayodhya)
5. Shakti Mishra, acting (Lucknow)
6. Manoj Kumar Verma, as the decor (Lucknow)
7. Hassan Akhtar, tabla playing (Delhi)
8. Mo. Hafeez, Rngdipan (Lucknow)
9. Swatantra Kale theater director (Lucknow)
10. Mangal Yadav writing folk music (Chandauli)
11. Shikha Khare (Kathak)
12. Muneesh Sappel (Mumbai's theater director)

=== 2017 ===
1. Pandit Bholanath Mishra, Hindustani Classical Vocalist (Delhi)
