= Theatre of India =

Theatre of India

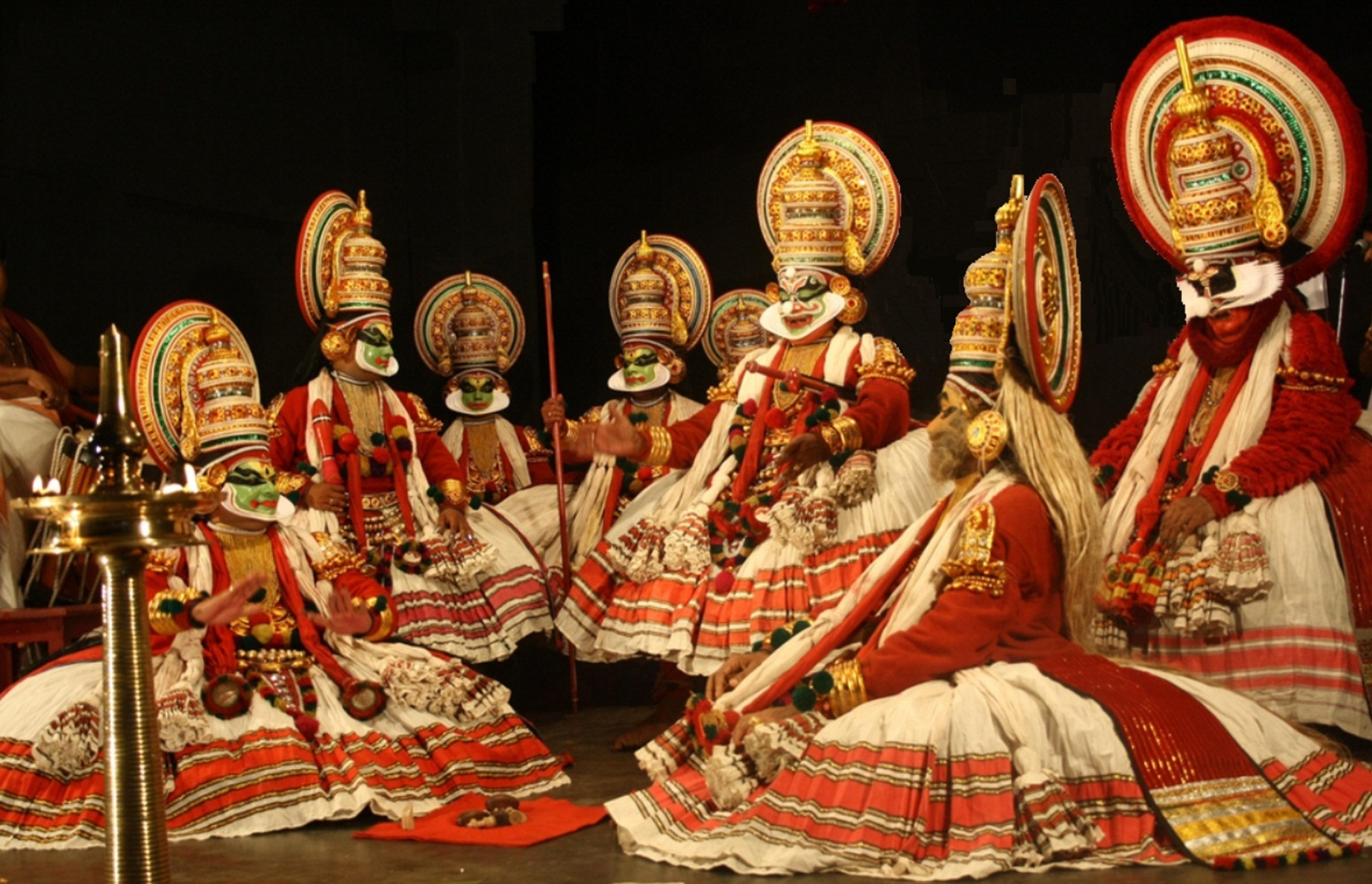
Kathakali, a classical theatre form from Kerala, India

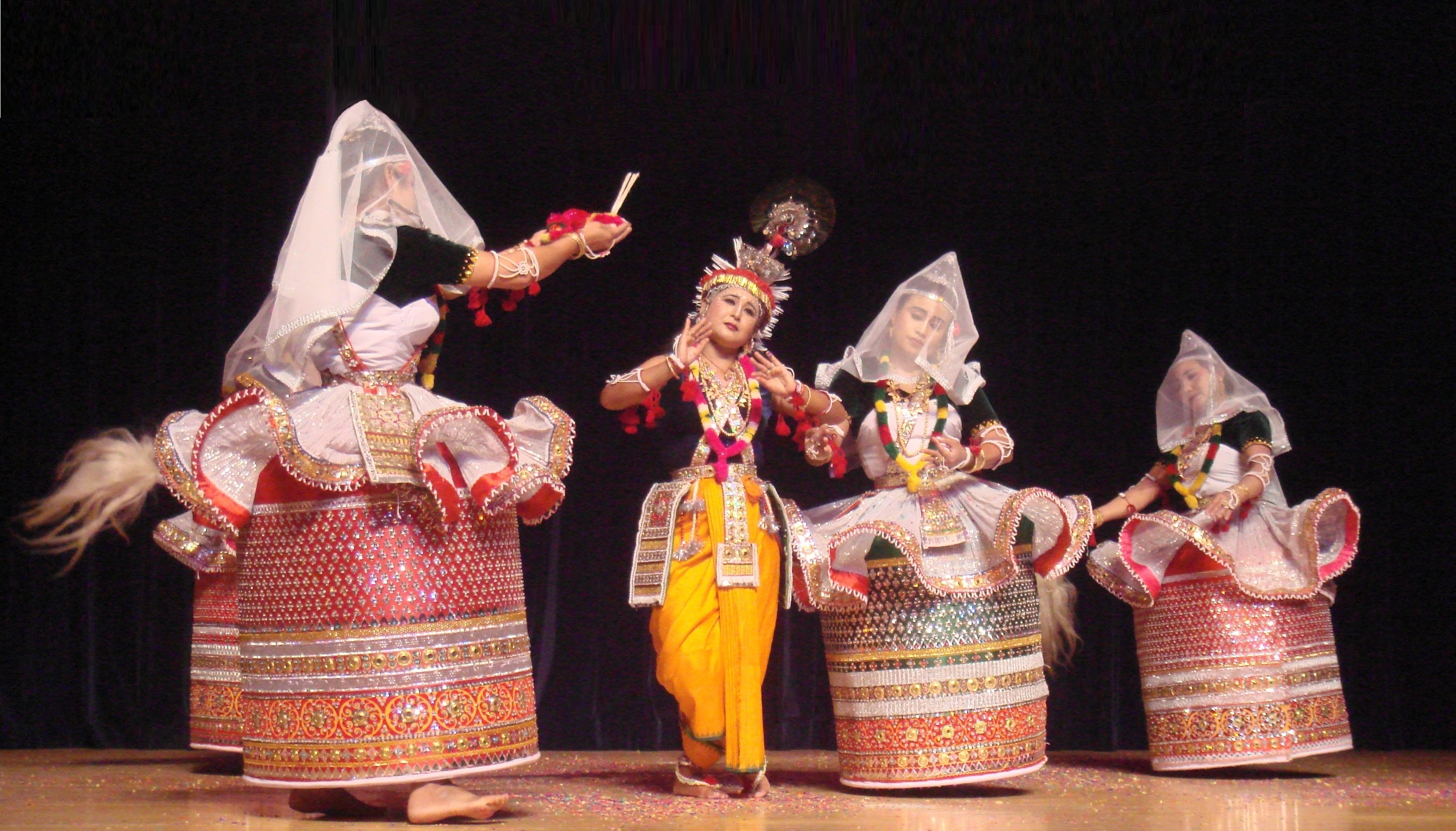
Rasa lila theatrical performance in Manipuri dance style

Theatre of India is one of the most ancient forms of theatre and it features a detailed textual, sculptural, and dramatic effects which emerged in mid first millennium BC. Like in the areas of music and dance, the Indian theatre is also defined by the dramatic performance based on the concept of Nritya, which is a Sanskrit word for drama but encompasses dramatic narrative, virtuosic dance, and music. Historically, Indian theatre has exerted influence beyond its borders, reaching ancient China and other countries in the Far East.

With the Islamic conquests that began in the 10th and 11th centuries, theatre was discouraged or forbidden entirely. Later, in an attempt to re-assert indigenous values and ideas, village theatre was encouraged across the subcontinent, developing in a large number of regional languages from the 15th to the 19th centuries. Modern Indian theatre developed during the period of colonial rule under the British Empire, from the mid-19th century until the mid-20th.

From the last half of the 19th century, theatres in India experienced a boost in numbers and practice. After Indian independence in 1947, theatres spread throughout India as one of the means of entertainment. As a diverse, multi-cultural nation, the theatre of India cannot be reduced to a single, homogenous trend.

In contemporary India, the major competition with its theatre is that represented by growing television industries and the spread of films produced in the various Indian film industries. Lack of finance is another major obstacle.

== History of Indian theatre ==
=== Sanskrit theatre ===
The history of the origin of theatre in India is highly controversial.

==== Early dating ====
According to some scholars, Indian theatre emerged in the 15th century BC. Vedic text such as Rigveda provides evidence of drama plays being enacted during Yagya ceremonies. The dialogues mentioned in the texts range from one person monologues to three person dialogues such as the dialogue between Indra, Indrani and Vrishakapi. The dialogues are not only religious in their context but also secular. For instance, one rigvedic monologue is about a gambler whose life is ruined because of it and has estranged his wife caves dating back to the 3rd century BC and Khandagiri caves from the 2nd century BC are the earliest examples of theatre architecture in India.

The dating of Bhasa is controversial and ranges from pre Natyashastra date of the 5th century BC to the 2nd century AD. Bhasa according to some scholars preceded Natyashastra tradition. Nandikeshvara who wrote Abhinaya Darpana lit. 'The Mirror of Gesture' which itself was based on the abridgement of a long treatise of 400 sholakas called Bharatarnava, according to some scholars seems to have preceded Bharata. The most concrete example of Nandikeshvara's teachings have survived thanks to Bhasa.

Natyashastra, dated earliest to 200 BC, although mentions various teachers and call them acharya but doesn't name them, but it still ends with a reference to a lost treatise of dramatist Kohala.

==== Late dating ====
According to scholars who insist on late dating, Sanskrit theatre emerged in the 2nd century BCE and flourished between the 1st century CE and the 10th, which was a period of relative peace in the history of India during which hundreds of plays were written. Despite its name, Sanskrit theatre was not exclusively in Sanskrit language. Other Indic languages collectively called as Prakrit were also used in addition to Sanskrit.

The earliest-surviving fragments of Sanskrit drama date from the 1st century CE. The wealth of archaeological evidence from earlier periods offers no indication of the existence of a tradition of theatre. The Vedas (the earliest Indian literature, from between 1500 and 600 BCE) contain no hint of it; although a small number of hymns are composed in a form of dialogue, the rituals of the Vedic period do not appear to have developed into theatre. The Mahābhāṣya by Patañjali contains the earliest reference to what may have been the seeds of Sanskrit drama. This treatise on grammar from 140 BCE provides a feasible date for the beginnings of theatre in India.

However, although there are no surviving fragments of any drama prior to this date, it is possible that early Buddhist literature provides the earliest evidence for the existence of Indian theater. The Pali suttas (ranging in date from the 5th to 3rd centuries BCE) refer to the existence of troupes of actors (led by a chief actor), who performed dramas on a stage. It is indicated that these dramas incorporated dance, but were listed as a distinct form of performance, alongside dancing, singing, and story recitations. (Note: According to later Buddhist texts, King Bimbisara (a contemporary of Gautama Buddha) had a drama performed for another king. This would be as early as the 5th century BCE, but the event is only described in much later texts, from the 3rd–4th centuries CE.)

The major source of evidence for Sanskrit theatre is A Treatise on Theatre (Nātyaśāstra), a compendium whose date of composition is uncertain (estimates range from 200 BCE to 200 CE) and whose authorship is attributed to Bharata Muni. The Treatise is the most complete work of dramaturgy in the ancient world. It addresses acting, dance, music, dramatic construction, architecture, costuming, make-up, props, the organisation of companies, the audience, competitions, and offers a mythological account of the origin of theatre. In doing so, it provides indications about the nature of actual theatrical practices. Sanskrit theatre was performed on sacred ground by priests who had been trained in the necessary skills (dance, music, and recitation) in a [hereditary process]. Its aim was both to educate and to entertain. Characters in Sanskrit plays were important. They were broadly classified into three kinds which are Nayaka(hero), Nayika(heroine) and the Vidusaka(Clown).

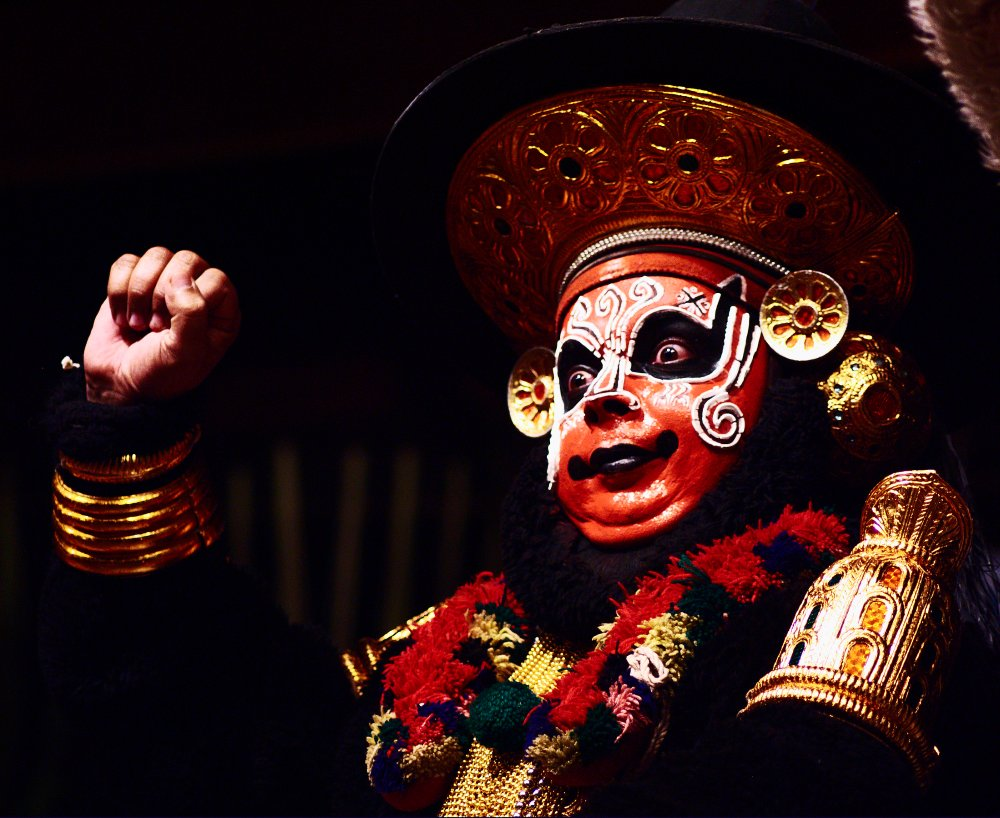
Performer playing Sugriva in the Koodiyattam form of Sanskrit theatre

An appreciation for the stagecraft and classic Sanskrit drama was seen as an essential part of a sophisticated world view, by the end of the seventh century. Under the patronage of royal courts, performers belonged to professional companies that were directed by a stage manager (sutradhar), who may also have acted. This task was thought of as being analogous to that of a puppeteer—the literal meaning of "sutradhar" is "holder of the strings or threads". The performers were trained rigorously in vocal and physical technique. There were no prohibitions against female performers; companies were all-male, all-female, and of mixed gender. Certain sentiments were considered inappropriate for men to enact, however, and were thought better suited to women. Some performers played characters their own age, while others played ages different from their own (whether younger or older). Of all the elements of theatre, the Treatise gives most attention to acting (abhinaya), which consists of two styles: realistic (lokadharmi) and conventional (natyadharmi), though the major focus is on the latter.

Its drama is regarded as the highest achievement of Sanskrit literature. It used stock characters, such as the hero (nayaka), heroine (nayika), or clown (vidusaka). Actors may have specialised in a particular type. Kālidāsa is arguably considered to be India's greatest Sanskrit dramatist, writing in the ca. 4th century CE-ca. 5th century CE. Three famous romantic plays written by Kālidāsa are the Mālavikāgnimitram (Mālavikā and Agnimitra), Vikramuurvashiiya (Pertaining to Vikrama and Urvashi), and Abhijñānaśākuntala (The Recognition of Shakuntala). The last was inspired by a story in the Mahabharata and is the most famous. It was the first to be translated into English and German. Śakuntalā (in English translation) influenced Goethe's Faust (1808–1832).

The next great Indian dramatist was Bhavabhuti (c. 7th century CE). He is said to have written the following three plays: Malati-Madhava, Mahaviracharita and Uttar Ramacharita. Among these three, the last two cover between them the entire epic of Ramayana. The powerful Indian emperor Harsha (606–648) is credited with having written three plays: the comedy Ratnavali, Priyadarsika, and the Buddhist drama Nagananda.

According to some scholars the earliest form of the classical theatre of India was the Sanskrit theatre which came into existence after the development of Greek and Roman theatre. One theory describes this development as an offshoot of Alexander the Great's Indian conquest. The invading army staged Greek-style plays and Indians picked up the performance art. While some scholars argue that traditional Indian theatre predated it, there is a recognition that classical Greek theatre has helped transformed it. The Greek origin of Indian theatre has not received popular acceptance.

=== Theatre in medieval India ===
India's artistic identity is deeply routed within its social, economical, cultural, and religious views. For this reason it is essential to understand Indian cultural practices as they relate directly to performers and performances of this time. Performances including dance, music, and text are an expression of devotion for the Indian culture, so when looking at 'theatre' of this time a broader definition must be ascribed to the word.

Based on the understanding that performing arts are audience-oriented and must continuously adapt to the socio-cultural landscape of their patronage. Northern India managed to retain their cultural traditions in spite of the new Turko-Persian influences. The early thirteenth century marked this change for the Indian culture, where Sanskrit dramas and stage craft had been previously revered by the elites, it was now no longer relevant. This was due to the invading cultures that began to dominate and did not appreciate or understand, and since they did not understand the Sanskrit language it could no longer be held in such a high regard, and as a consequence many theatre artist suffered from neglect.

The commonplace to find performers was in urban centers, because it was there they were able to find work to support themselves. Large temples where home to musical and theatrical shows.

A Bharata Natyshatra also known as the śāstra was written to list costumes, gestures, positions of the body, and make up. It also lists plots that were weighed unsuitable and it also the most completed document. Most of Indian theatre had no scenery. There was usually a few props like a brass lamp.

When the concept of "Theatrical Art" was introduced, medieval India was narrating poems. Bhakti poetry became popular.

During medieval India Bhavabhuti was a famous dramatist, he had three portent plays Malati-Madhava, Magviracharita and the Uttar Ramacharita.

=== Theatre in India under the British ===
Under British colonial rule, modern Indian theatre began when a theatre was started in Belgachia. One of the earliest plays composed and staged during this period was Buro Shalikher Ghaare Roa (1860) by Michael Madhusudan Dutt, both in Bengali. Around the same time, Nil Darpan (1858–59, first commercial production in 1872, by Girish Chandra Ghosh at the national theatre in Calcutta) a Bengali play by Dinabandhu Mitra garnered both accolades and controversy for depicting the horror and tragedy of indigo cultivation in rural Bengal, and played a major role in the indigo revolt. Rabindranath Tagore was a pioneering modern playwright who wrote plays noted for their exploration and questioning of nationalism, identity, spiritualism and material greed. His plays are written in Bengali and include Chitra (Chitrangada, 1892), The King of the Dark Chamber (Raja, 1910), The Post Office (Dakghar, 1913), and Red Oleander (Raktakarabi, 1924).

Kalyanam Raghuramaiah, a recipient of the Sangeet Natak Akademi Award, and the Padmashri, was known for the roles of Krishna or Dushyantha, Bhavanisankar, Narada etc. in Telugu theatre. He performed those roles for about 60 years. He indulged in elaborate raga alapana, based on different ragas while rendering padyams. One of the finest method actors, He had the ability to sing padyams and songs through whistle, by putting his finger in mouth and producing the whistle or flute sound (meaning Eela in Telugu). He has acted in various dramas and gave more than 20,000 stage performances. He was called the "Nightingale of the Stage" by Rabindranath Tagore.

The British believed that the Indian actors were mystical creatures. They believed they brought them luck and prosperity. The emergent modern Indian theater, which is also referred to as Native theatre, features a theatrical approach that has been viewed as an intersection of Indian social space with Western theater formats and conventions. The resulting theatrical space is described to be existing at the material, symbolic, and discursive levels. To resist its use by Indians as an instrument of protest against colonial rule, the British Government imposed the Dramatic Performances Act in 1876.

=== Indian theatre after Independence (1947–1992) ===
The Modern Endangered Archives Program funded a digitization project carried out by Natarang Pratishthan which digitized theatre brochures from 1946 to present. These brochures provide information on what plays were performed during this period as well as provide an anthropological source of who/what sustained theatre in both big and small cities around India. This collection of brochures is available through the UCLA library.

==== Improvisation ====
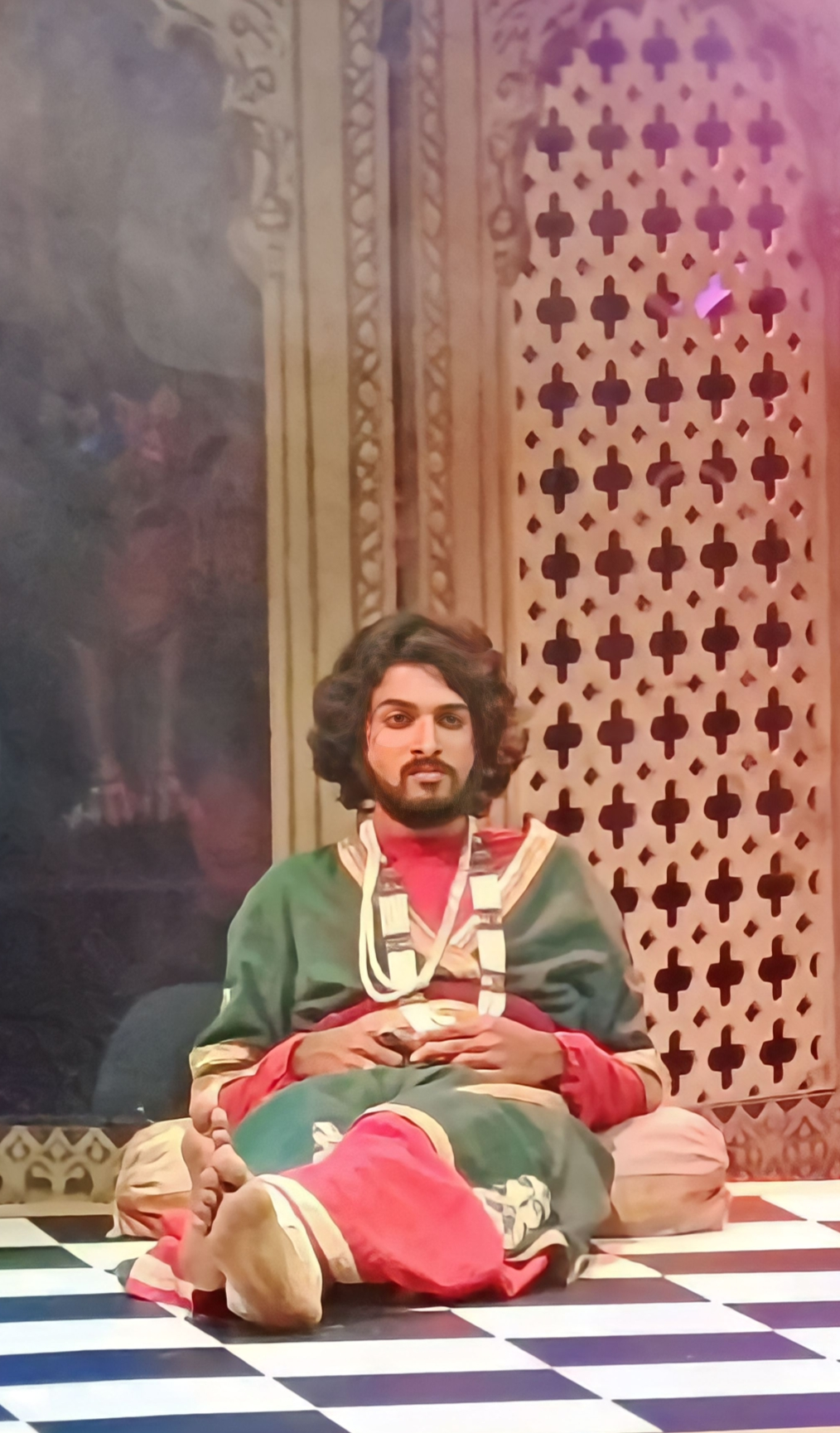
Actor playing the role of Mohammad Bin Tughlak

Improvisational (also known as improv or impro) is a form of theatre in which the actors use improvisational acting techniques to perform spontaneously. Improvisers typically use audience suggestions to guide the performance as they create dialogue, setting, and plot extemporaneously.

Many improvisational actors also work as scripted actors and "improv" techniques are often taught in standard acting classes. The basic skills of listening, clarity, confidence, and performing instinctively and spontaneously are considered important skills for actors to develop.

Improvisational theatre in India is largely used for educational, interventional and entertainment purposes. The traces of improvisational theatre in India date back to the 1990s with the advent of Forum theatre with Jana Sanskriti under the leadership of Sanjoy Ganguly. After that in 1999, a team from the US with Bev Hoskins and Mary Good introduced Playback theatre to India. Thus Playback theatre and Forum theatre began to take shape in the remotest parts of India, such as Karur, Chennai, West Bengal, as well as Bangalore. Yours Truly Theatre, a Bangalore-based group, developed "complete the story", an indigenous format of improvisational theatre developed under the leadership of Ranji David and Nandini Rao in 2006. In 2009, they also developed another form of improvisational theatre called "mushyara theatre".

In the late 1960s Badal Sircar introduced a new form of political theatre called the Third Theatre. Badal Sarkar's anti-establishment experimental theatre created a new genre of social enlightenment. He formed his first Third Theatre Group satabdi, in the year 1967. They used to perform Drama written by Badal Sircar in Anganmancha (theatre in the courtyard) in the Third Theatre form that break away from the tradition of One point view of the Proscenium and urged on the taking theatre to the people.

Improvisational Theatre groups in India:

- Yours Truly Theatre

Improvisational Theatre forms practiced in India:

- Playback theatre
- Theatre of the Oppressed
- Forum theatre

==== Notable theatres in India in different Indian languages and regions ====
- Bengali theatre
- Gujarati theatre
- Hindi theatre
- Marathi theatre
- Telugu theatre

== Notable people ==
=== Ancient Indian playwrights ===
- Bhāsa
- Bhavabhuti
- Kalidasa
- Bharata Muni

=== Playwrights working under British rule ===
- Vishnudas Bhave
- Jaishankar Bhojak 'Sundari'
- Bankim Chandra Chatterjee
- Govind Ballal Deval
- Michael Madhusudan Dutt
- Girish Chandra Ghosh
- Annasaheb Kirloskar
- Bhartendu Harishchandra
- Dinabandhu Mitra
- Jaishankar Prasad
- Dwijendralal Ray
- Rabindranath Tagore

=== Post-Independence theatre-makers ===
Notable theatre directors:

- Ebrahim Alkazi
- K.V. Akshara
- Nadira Babbar
- Ram Gopal Bajaj
- Ajitesh Bandopadhyay
- Sisir Bhaduri
- Suresh Bhardwaj
- Bijon Bhattacharya
- Raj Bisaria
- Manish Joshi Bismil
- Bibhash Chakraborty
- Chandradasan
- Soumitra Chatterjee
- Neelam Mansingh Chowdhry
- Satyadev Dubey
- Utpal Dutta
- Arvind Gaur
- Sachin Gupta
- Safdar Hashmi
- Shafi Inamdar
- Nemi Chandra Jain
- Shyamanand Jalan
- Prithviraj Kapoor
- Shashi Kapoor
- B.V. Karanth
- Bansi Kaul
- Kader Khan
- Mohan Maharishi
- Ramesh Mehta
- Shaoli Mitra
- Sombhu Mitra
- Shankar Nag
- Balraj Pandit
- Kavalam Narayana Panicker
- Mrityunjay Prabhakar
- Prasanna
- Rathna Shekar Reddy
- Rudraprasad Sengupta
- B.M. Shah
- Naseeruddin Shah
- Gursharan Singh
- Badal Sircar
- Deepan Sivaraman
- Anjan Srivastav
- K.V. Subbanna
- Habib Tanvir Bhopal
- Ratan Thiyam
- Amitesh Grover
- Kumara Varma
- Sankar Venkateswaran

=== Notable playwrights ===
- Gurazada Apparao (Telugu)
- Abhimanyu (Malayalam)
- Satish Alekar (Marathi)
- Rambriksh Benipuri (Hindi)
- Datta Bhagat (Marathi)
- Dharamvir Bharati (Hindi)
- Bijon Bhattacharya (Bangla)
- Anupama Chandrasekhar (English)
- Mohit Chattopadhyay (Bangla)
- Asif Currimbhoy (English)
- Gurcharan Das (English)
- Mahesh Dattani (English)
- Swadesh Deepak (Hindi)
- Govind Purushottam Deshpande (Marathi)
- Utpal Datta (Bangla)
- Utpal Dutt (Bangla)
- Mahesh Elkunchwar (Marathi)
- Sachin Gupta (Hindi)
- Hasan Imam (Hindi)
- Rajesh Joshi (Hindi)
- Sharad Joshi (Hindi)
- T. P. Kailasam (Kannada, English)
- Sriranga (Kannada)
- Samsa (Kannada)
- Chandrashekhara Kambara (Kannada)
- Prithviraj Kapoor (Hindi), (Urdu), (Pashto), (Bangla)
- Girish Karnad (Kannada)
- Kader Khan (Urdu)
- Tulsi Lahiri (Bangla)
- Sajitha Madathil (Malayalam)
- Ramesh Mehta (Urdu)
- Piyush Mishra (Hindi)
- Manoj Mitra (Bengali)
- Torit Mitra (Bengali)
- Narendra Mohan (Hindi)
- Manjula Padmanabhan (English)
- Samkutty Pattomkary (Malayalam)
- Vayala Vasudevan Pillai ( Malayalam)
- Mohan Rakesh (Hindi)
- Bhisham Sahni (Hindi)
- Badal Sarkar (Bengali)
- Sarveshwar Dayal Saxena (Hindi)
- B. M. Shah (Urdu)
- Partap Sharma (English)
- Gopal Sharman (English)
- Javed Siddiqui (Urdu)
- Harcharan Singh (Punjabi)
- Hrishikesh Sulabh
- Rajesh Talwar (English)
- Habib Tanvir ( Hindi/ Urdu )
- Vijay Tendulkar (Marathi)
- Shreekumar Varma (English)
- Surendra Verma (Hindi)
- Asghar Wajahat (Urdu)
- Naren Weiss (English)

== Forms of Indian theatre ==
=== Traditional Indian theatre ===
Kutiyattam is the only surviving specimen of the ancient Sanskrit theatre, thought to have originated around the beginning of the Common Era, and is officially recognised by UNESCO as a Masterpiece of the Oral and Intangible Heritage of Humanity. In addition, many forms of Indian folk theatre abound. Bhavai (strolling players) is a popular folk theatre form of Gujarat, said to have arisen in the 14th century AD. Bhaona and Ankiya Nats have been practicing in Assam since the early 16th century which were created and initiated by Mahapurusha Srimanta Sankardeva. Jatra has been popular in Bengal and its origin is traced to the Bhakti movement in the 16th century. Another folk theatre form popular in Haryana, Uttar Pradesh and Malwa region of Madhya Pradesh is Swang, which is dialogue-oriented rather than movement-oriented and is considered to have arisen in its present form in the late 18th – early 19th centuries.

Yakshagana is a very popular theatre art in Karnataka and has existed under different names at least since the 16th century. It is semi-classical in nature and involves music and songs based on carnatic music, rich costumes, storylines based on the Mahabharata and Ramayana. It also employs spoken dialogue in-between its songs that gives it a folk art flavour. Kathakali is a form of dance-drama, characteristic of Kerala, that arose in the 17th century, developing from the temple-art plays Krishnanattam and Ramanattam.

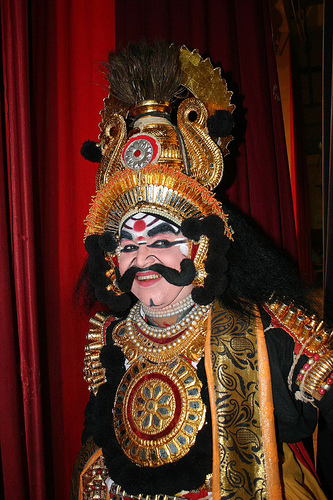

=== Urdu/Hindustani theatre ===
Urdu drama evolved from the prevailing dramatic traditions of North India shaping Rahas or Raas as practiced by exponents like Wajid Ali Shah, Nawab of Awadh. His dramatic experiments led to the famous Inder Sabha of Agha Hasan Amanat, and later this tradition took the shape of Parsi theatre. Yahudi Ki Ladki (The Jew's Daughter) by Agha Hashar Kashmiri is the culmination of this tradition.

Among all the languages Urdu (which was called Hindi by early writers), along with Gujrati, Marathi and Bengali theatres have kept flourishing and demand for its writers and artists has not subsided by the drama aficionados. All the early gems of Urdu theatre (performed by Parsi Companies) were made into films. Great works like those by Shakespeare have influenced modern Urdu tradition to a large extent when Indian, Iranian, Turkish stories and folk was adapted for stage with heavy doses of Urdu poetry. In modern times writers like Imtiaz Ali Taj, Rafi Peer, Krishan Chander, Manto, Upender Nath Ashk, Ghulam Rabbani, Prof. Mujeeb and many others shaped this tradition.

While Prof Hasan, Ghulam Jeelani, J.N. Kaushal, Shameem Hanfi, Jameel Shaidayi etc. belong to the old generation, contemporary writers like Mujeeb Khan, Javed Siddiqui, Sayeed Alam, Danish Iqbal, Anis Azmi, Aftab Hasnain, Aslam Parvez, Anis Javed, Iqbal Niyazi, Syed Sahil Agha and Zaheer Anwar are postmodern playwrights actively contributing in the field of Urdu drama.

Zaheer Anwar has kept the flag of Urdu theatre flying in Kolkata. Unlike the writers of previous generations, Danish iqbal and Zaheer do not write bookish plays but their work is a product of a vigorous performing tradition. Iqbal Niyazi of Mumbai has written several plays in Urdu. His play Aur Kitne Jalyanwala BaughU?? won a national award and other awards. Hence this is the only generation after Amanat and Agha Hashr who actually write for the stage and not for libraries.

The group Aatrangi Pitaara Foundation is actively performing and saving Hindustani theatre. Their presentation of Anti-National Ghalib, written by Danish Iqbal, has been well received by the Delhi Theatre enthusiasts. Leading the group, Keshav Raina is developing more Hindustani shows showcasing the rich history and heritage of India.

=== Indian puppet theatre ===
Yakshagana is a popular semi-classical theatre art from coastal Karnataka. It uses rich costumes, music, dance, and dialogue. Puppet shows in parts of Karnataka use all these elements of yakshagana to depict stories from the Ramayana and Mahabharata.

=== Indian street theatre ===
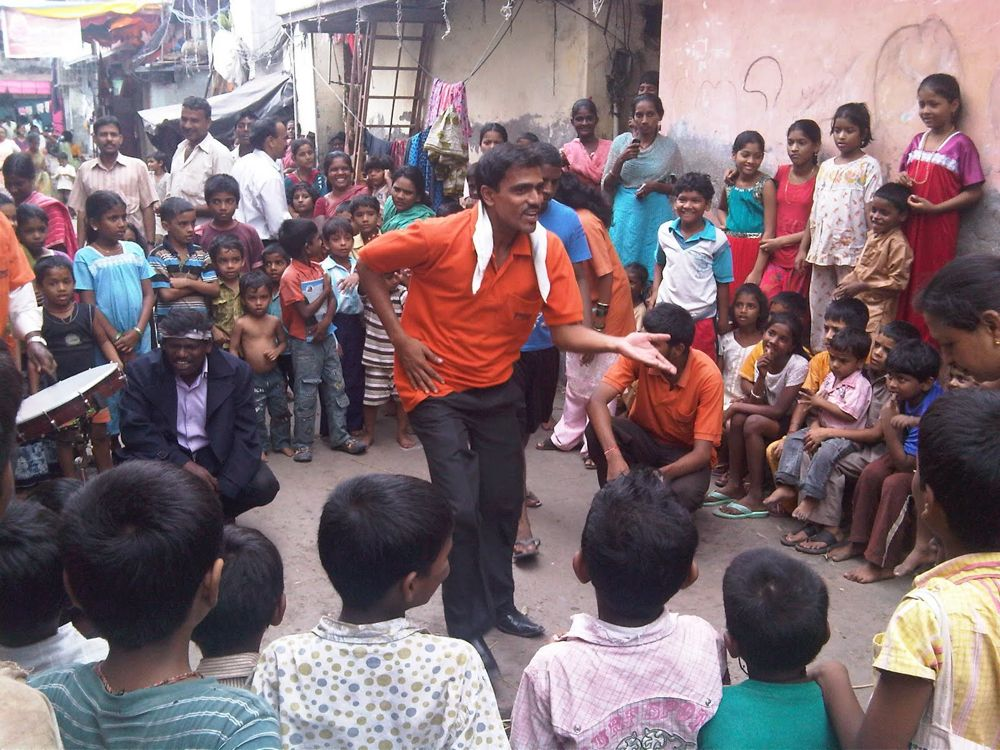
A street play (nukkad natak) in Dharavi slums in Mumbai

- Jan Natya Manch (JANAM)

=== Mobile theatre ===
Mobile theatres are a kind of popular theatre form that exist mainly in Assam. For staging their plays, theatre groups travel different places with their casts, singers, musicians, dancers and entire crew. Even the tent and chairs for the audience are carried with them. Mobile theatre was first staged on 2 October 1963 in Pathsala, Assam. Achyut Lahkar is known as the father of mobile theatre.

== Notable awards and festivals ==
=== Awards ===
- Sangeet Natak Akademi Award
- Theatre Pasta Theatre Awards
- Kalidas Samman

=== Festivals of theatre in India ===
- Prithvi Theatre Festival (Prithvi Festival), held every year since its inception on 3 November, the birth anniversary of its legendary founder Prithviraj Kapoor
- Bharat Rang Mahotsav, NSD, New Delhi
- Jairangam - Jaipur Theatre Festival, Jaipur
- Nandikar's National Theatre Festival
- Purple Umbrella Theater Festival, New Delhi

== Notable groups and companies ==
- Aasakta Kalamanch
- Bhoomika Theatre Group
- Chilsag Chillies Theatre Company
- Dramanon
- Indian People's Theatre Association
- Kerala People's Arts Club
- Manch Theatre
- The Madras Players
- Masquerade Chennai
- Nandikar
- Ninasam
- Platform for Action in Creative Theater
- Prithvi Theatre
- Rangayana
- Ranga Shankara
- Samahaara
- Theatre Arts Workshop (TAW)
- Theatre Formation Paribartak
- WeMove Theatre

== Notable theatres ==
- Academy of Fine Arts, Kolkata (Ranu Mukherjee Mancha)
- Circle Theatre Company (2003)
- Girish Mancha
- Kalidasa Kalakendram
- National School of Drama
- Rabindra Sadan
- Star Theatre
- Surabhi (theatre group)

== Notable practitioners who have moved from theatre to films ==
- Mohan Agashe
- Sadashiv Amrapurkar
- Shabana Azmi
- Raj Babbar
- Manoj Bajpayee
- Paran Bandyopadhyay
- Surangana Bandyopadhyay
- Bratya Basu
- Tanikella Bharani
- Suresh Bhardwaj
- Anirban Bhattacharya
- Seema Biswas
- Soumitra Chatterjee
- Prashant Damle
- Deepak Dobriyal
- Utpal Dutt
- Vikram Gokhale
- Neena Gupta
- Rajendra Gupta
- A. K. Hangal
- Rohini Hattangadi
- Shafi Inamdar
- Bharat Jadhav
- Brijendra Kala
- Dada Kondke
- Shahid Kapoor
- Prithviraj Kapoor
- Raj Kapoor
- Shammi Kapoor
- Shashi Kapoor
- Pankaj Kapur
- Girish Karnad
- Satish Kaushik
- Kader Khan
- Shah Rukh Khan
- Kulbhushan Kharbanda
- Anupam Kher
- Swanand Kirkire
- Shriram Lagoo
- Sajitha Madathil
- Shilpi Marwaha
- Piyush Mishra
- Sohrab Modi
- Ananth Nag
- Shankar Nag
- Alok Nath
- Nirmal Pandey
- Nana Patekar
- Smita Patil
- Om Puri
- Rajkumar
- Kangana Ranaut
- Paresh Rawal
- Rathna Shekar Reddy
- Balraj Sahni
- Ashok Saraf
- Kaushik Sen
- Riddhi Sen
- Naseeruddin Shah
- Ratna Pathak Shah
- Om Shivpuri
- Sudha Shivpuri
- Shilpa Shukla
- Nawazuddin Siddiqui
- Pankaj Tripathi
- Ashish Vidyarthi
- Rajpal Yadav

== Training ==
- Bhartendu Academy of Dramatic Arts
- National School of Drama
- Madhya Pradesh School of Drama

== See also ==
- Malayalam drama

== Sources ==
- Banham, Martin, ed. 1998. The Cambridge Guide to Theatre. Cambridge: Cambridge UP. ISBN 0-521-43437-8.
- Brandon, James R. 1981. Introduction. In Baumer and Brandon (1981, xvii–xx).
- ---, ed. 1997. The Cambridge Guide to Asian Theatre.' 2nd, rev. ed. Cambridge: Cambridge UP. ISBN 978-0-521-58822-5.
- Brockett, Oscar G. and Franklin J. Hildy. 2003. History of the Theatre. Ninth edition, International edition. Boston: Allyn and Bacon. ISBN 0-205-41050-2.
- Baumer, Rachel Van M., and James R. Brandon, eds. 1981. Sanskrit Theatre in Performance. Delhi: Motilal Banarsidass, 1993. ISBN 978-81-208-0772-3.
- Richmond, Farley. 1998. "India." In Banham (1998, 516–525).
- Richmond, Farley P., Darius L. Swann, and Phillip B. Zarrilli, eds. 1993. Indian Theatre: Traditions of Performance. U of Hawaii P. ISBN 978-0-8248-1322-2.
- Sharma, Shrikrishna, ed. 1996. Rangkarmi. Cultural Societies of Rajasthan. (1996, 139)
