= Suresh Bhardwaj =

Suresh Bhardwaj may refer to:

- Suresh Bhardwaj (NSD), an Indian theatre, film and television director
- Suresh Bhardwaj (politician), an Indian politician, member of the Bharatiya Janata Party and a member of the Himachal Pradesh Legislative Assembly.
