= Suresh Bhardwaj (actor) =

Indian film director

- Born: 6 June 1955 (age 71); Delhi, India
- Education: National School of Drama
- Occupation: Theatre Director
- Organization(s): Aakar Kala Sangam, New Delhi

Suresh Bhardwaj (born 6 June 1955) is an Indian theatre, film and television director as well as a lighting and scenic designer, currently residing in Kandiwali West, Mumbai . He has acted in many plays as lead actor as well. He is the director of (Aakar Kala Sangam) (AKS), a Delhi based theatre group. He has also served as faculty member of the National School of Drama In 2005 he received the Sangeet Natak Akademi Award for lighting design from the Sangeet Natak Akademi, India's National Academy of Music, Dance & Drama.

== Life and career ==
He holds an M.A degree . He subsequently joined the National School of Drama in his home city where he became a research fellow in the extension wing of the school before his 1981 promotion to technical director at Rangmandal in the Bharat Bhavan arts complex, Bhopal.

In 1985, Bhardwaj formed the theatre group Sambhav in Delhi, bringing together an artists' ensemble that became a landmark phenomenon in modern Indian theatre and which featured in the research work of eminent art scholars. The same year, he shifted his emphasis to film, television and cinema and worked in various capacities as a writer, director, Actor and scenographer as well as for various satellite channels and public television broadcaster Doordarshan as a freelance director, designer and writer. Bhardwaj conceived and directed many popular programmes including Aap Ki Adalat for Zee TV as well as Aasmaan Kaise Kaise, Lekhu, Gumraah, Uth Jaag Musafir, Apne Apne Sapne and many more for Doordarshan.

Bhardwaj joined the faculty of the National School of Drama as visiting professor in 1988 and was appointed a regular faculty member in 1991 as a lecturer in stage lighting. He was promoted to the post of associate professor (theatre architecture) and is currently working as a Professor. He served as dean of National School of Drama from 2000 to 2002, and was also appointed Professor of Extension Programmes in February 2002. Bhardwaj retired as a professor from this pioneering Indian institute in 2017.

== Awards ==
- National Sangeet Natak Akademi Award (2005) from Indian President, Dr. APJ Abdul Kalam Azad for National Achievements in the theatre and allied arts.
- Special ROSCO (UK) award from the Chaman Lal Memorial Society for excellence in theatre.
- Habib Tanveer Rang puraskaar-2011 by Ras Kala Manch, Haryana.
- Pataliputra Award, a national award conferred by 'Praangan' Patna for lifetime achievement in drama.

== Juries and committees ==
=== Juries ===
- Served on the international jury for ITI UNESCO's 2005 international theatre workshops and drama school presentations in Romania.
- Panel member for Doordarshan public TV, India as director of sponsored serial for the national network.

=== Committees ===
- Ministry of Culture: Committees on production, building, equipment, salary, and pension grants; folk and tribal schemes; scholarships; junior and senior fellowships; multipurpose cultural complexes; accommodation for eminent artists.
- Committee to judge proposals for senior fellowships, University Grants Commission.
- Committee to judge the audio-video proposals for various schemes, Ministry of Women and Child Welfare.
- Expert committee to judge tableaux etc. for inclusion in the Republic Day Festival, Ministry of Defence.
- Selection committee, International Theatre Festival, Bharangam.
- Expert committee, Indian Tourism Development Corporation, Ministry of Tourism, Government of India.
- Member of Preview committee of International Film Festival of India, Ministry of I&B, Government of India.
- Member Board of Studies, Punjabi University, Patiala

Bhardwaj is known for his contributions in the field of theatre education and has conducted more than 200 theatre workshops throughout India and abroad. He also designed the lighting and sound systems of many of India's prestigious theatres including the Antrang and Bahirang auditorium at Bharat Bhavan Bhopal (1982), and the indoor and outdoor theatre at Preetnagar, Amritsar (2002). He acted as lighting, sound, acoustic and stage furnishing consultant at Rabindra Bhavan, Bhopal (2004) and was also a consultant on the auditorium of BHEL, Bhopal and Jammu University, Jammu.Consultant and Designer of Kalidas Theatre of NZCC, Patiala.

== Writings ==
- Adaptation of Albert Camus' The Just, published as Jaayaz Hatyaare by Raj-Kamal, Prakashan.
- Adaptation of Strindberg's The Creditors as Dastak in Hindi.
- Adaptation of the Russian play Irony of Fate as Golmaal in Hindi.
- Screenplay and dialogues for a teleplay of Shamsheer Singh Ka Thiala for Doordarshan, India, selected as an Indian entry for the International Television circuit. (1987)
- Story, screenplay and dialogue for the 35mm film for Kribhco entitled Shahad Ki Chadi (1988).
- Story, screenplay and dialogue for the 35mm film Ganpat Ki Kahani (1988).
- Screenplay and dialogue for the well-known artistic serial Ek Kahani by Manju and Jyot Singh (1987).
- Screenplay and dialogue for a 60-minute telefilm Chuimui for the Ministry of Health and Family Welfare (1990).
- Story, screenplay and dialogue for the serial Chauke Pe Chakka, a sponsored serial on DD-Metro (1992).
- Dialogue for the serial Lekhu in Doordarshan's sponsored category, a famous children's serial (1987).
- Story, screenplay and dialogue for the TV serial Bharti, commissioned by Doordarshan to commemorate the 50th Anniversary of Indian Independence with thirty-minute episodes entitled Durgan, Shakti and Bahta Paani (1992).
- Story, screenplay and dialogue for the 60-minute tele-film Chestha for the Ministry of Welfare (1993).
- Story, screenplay and dialogues for the 60-minute tele-film Pehchaan for the Ministry of Welfare (1993).
- Screenplay and dialogue for the tele-film Khandhar commissioned by Doordarshan (1994).
- Writer of more than 100 scripts for short social message films for Doordarshan, Davp and various other ministries and departments.
- Writer of scripts and research for a number of 15- to 30-minute documentaries for Doordarshan, ministries and corporations.

== Directing ==
- Several episodes of the serial Aasmaan kaise kaise (1986).
- 13-episode serial Lekhu for the Doordarshan national network (1988).
- 10-episode serial Jhingur Pahalwaan for morning transmission on Doordarshan (1990).
- 35mm film Ganpat Ki Kahani for U.P. Ganna Vikas Sansthaan (1988).
- Sponsored serial Heere Moti pilot serial episode approved by Doordarshan (1992).
- 60-minute tele-film Gumraah for Doordarshan (1993).
- 60-minute film Chotu Motu Aur Lottery Ka Ticket for Doordarshan's metro channel and video circuit release (1995).
- 90-minute teleplay Uth Jaag Musafir for DD3 (1996).
- More than 10 episodes of the well-known TV Show Aap Ki Adalat.. for Zee TV (1992–94).
- 60-minute tele-film for the Ministry of the Environment, Maila Paani (1996).
- 60-minute film Shahd Ki Chadi (1995).
- ComDD Bharti Apne Apne Sapne (2005).
- International film for CPC prasar Bharti Aql Badi Ya Bhains (2006).
- 15-minute documentary for Doordarshan Traditional Akhadas of Delhi.
- 15-minute feature for Doordarshan Kabootarbaazi.
- 15-minute documentary feature for Doordarshan Mehndi.
- 15-minute feature for Doordarshan Jhalliwalas.
- 30-minute documentary on drugs Andha Kuan.
- 30-minute docu-feature for Doordarshan on elderly people Dhalta Suraj.
- 15-minute feature for Doordarshan Mitti Ke Khilone.
- 15-minute feature for Doordarshan Bioscope.
- 15-minute feature for Doordarshan Patang Ki Kala.
- 15-minute feature for Doordarshan Rafoogar.
- 15-minute feature for Doordarshan Tonga – Shahi Savaari.
- 15-minute feature for Doordarshan Haathi Daant Se Chandan Tak.
- 15-minute feature for Doordarshan Goldsmith.
- Bharti (1995), a three-part, 30-minute-per-episode serial for Doordarshan:
  - Durgan
  - Bahta Paani
  - Shakti
- Teleplay series Yavanika for Zee TV, which includes the noted Parsi era play Rustom Sohraab (1992).
- 30-minute film on old cinematography and still photography techniques Yaadon Ka Safar.
- Six-episode serial for the Doordarshan national network Kahaniyaan Hi Kahaniyaan.
- Six-episode serial for the Doordarshan national network Khel Khel Main Vigyaan.
- 12-episode serial for children for the Doordarshan national network Mast Maza.
- Fqal Badi Ya Bhainas, which was the official entry for the ASEAN festival organised by BHK, Japan, 2008.
- Bharatnatyam for CPC Delhi, a series telecast in 2009.
- Around 60 TV shorts for and commissioned by Doordarshan.
- Co-director of the TV serial Boond Boond a politically controversial serial dealing with the personality conflict of ex prime minister V P Singh.
- Co-director of many TV serials, advertisements and feature films.
- Six TV spots commissioned by Doordarshan dealing with persons and companies of high repute.

== Art directing ==
- Former art director of the well known Aap Ki Adalat, a popular TV serial hosted by Rajat Sharma.
- Art director of the TV serial Purvai, directed by Ranjit Kapoor.
- Art director of the TV serial Zameen, directed by M K Raina.
- Set designer for Antakshri, Mast Maza, Khel Khel Main Vigyan, Kahaniyaan Hi Kahaniyaan, Musichamp and a number of adverts, game shows, talk shows and budget specials for Zee TV and other stations.

== Theatre direction ==
- Bakri by Sarveshwar Dayal Saxena for M.P. Natak Lok Kala Akademi. Ujjain (1978).
- Musical play for children for the National School of Drama's children theatre wing Raja Ke Do Seeng written by Akhilesh Khanna (1980).
- Adhe Adhure written by Mohan Rakesh for Sambhav, Delhi (1985).
- Solah January Ki Raat for Sambhav, Delhi (1986).
- Inspector Matadin, based on story by Harishankar Parsai for the National School of Drama's workshop for N.T.P.C. (1998).
- Bechara Bhagwan, for the National School of Drama's workshop for N.T.P.C. (1999).
- Kaffan, musical play based on Premchand's story and adapted by S.P. Saxena for the Little Theatre Group Repertory (2000).
- Prem Samvaad, based on the stories of Munshi Premchand for AKS (2001).
- Saari Raat by Badal Sircar, for AKS (2003).
- Aur Agle Saal by Javed Siddiqui, for AKS (2004).
- Main Aur Meri Zindgi, by Deepa Tyagi (2005).
- 8 Ghante, by Sujit Saraf (2007).
- Intezaar Abhi Aur, play written by Meeta Mishra and himself (2009).
- Hum Tum, play written by Arbuzov and translated by Rahil Bhardwaj(2011)
- Chatushkon, A bangla play written by Sh. Bratya Basu in Hindi.(2014)
- Laagi chute na, an Original Hindi playWritten by Ms. Sangeeta Bhatnagar, an awarded playwright by Sahitya Kala Parishad, Delhi.
- Welcome Zindagi a Gujarati play by famous playwright Saumya Joshi and translated into Hindi by Rahil Bhardwaj.

== Set and lighting design ==
- Directed by B. V. Karanth: Andher Nagri, Shahjahan, Amal Vimal Kamal evam.., Vidya Sunder, Suno Janmejaya, Ghasiram Kotwal, Visakhdutt, Malvikagnimitram, Chaturbhani, Matia Burz, Hayavadana and various other plays.
- Directed by Devraj Ankur: Kajar Ki Kothri, Mahabhoj, Ek Satya Harishchandra, Anaro, Kahaniyaan Hi Kahaniyaan, Apne Apne Ajnabi, Ai ladkee, Tin Ka Sipahi, Bus Stand Ki Ek Raat, and a number of Katha collages.
- Directed by Ram Gopal Bajaj: Andha Yug, Yayati, Charvak, Lower Depth, Ek Purush, Dedh Purush.
- Directed by M. K. Raina: Swapanvasvadatta, Balcharitram, Karnabharam, Urubhangam, Dootvakyam, Main Hi Hoon Kaalpurush, Openheimer, Servant of Two Masters, Madhvi, Hanush, Ghosts, Enemy of the people, Saadat Hasan Manto.
- Directed by Barry John: Servant of Two Masters, An Accidental Death, Oedipus Rex.
- Directed by Prasanna: Ascent of Fujiyama, Teen Behnen, Aakhri Qitaab, The Father, Bela meri Jaan.

Bhardwaj has also worked with directors such as Fritz Bennewitz, Bansi Kaul, Ratan Thiyam, Anuradha Kapur, Kirti Jain, Prof.Mohan Maharishi, Alakhnandan and Neelam Mansingh Chowdhrey
