= Mrityunjay Prabhakar =

Mrityunjay Kumar Prabhakar
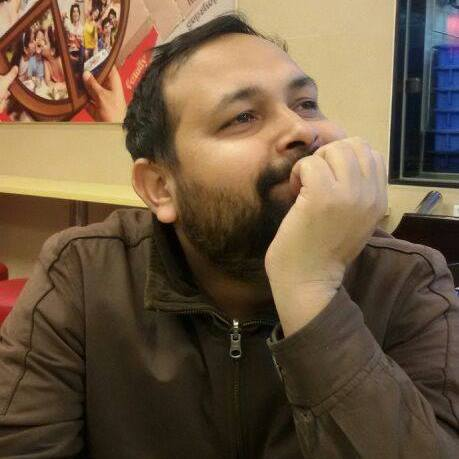
- Theatre director, playwright and poet
- Born: 14 September 1979 (age 46); Nalanda, India
- Other names: Mrityunjay Prabhakar
- Occupations: Playwright, theatre director, theatre critic, poet
- Known for: Theatre Activism

Mrityunjay Kumar Prabhakar (born 14 September 1979) is an Indian playwright, theatre director, theatre critic, poet, Assistant Professor of Drama and Theatre Art at Visva-Bharati University in Santiniketan, West Bengal and the recipient of Bihar Kala Samman by the government of Bihar in 2012.

== Early life and education ==
Born in a lower-middle class family from a village in Nalanda, Bihar, he attended Jawaharlal Nehru University, New Delhi where he completed his doctorate in Theatre and Performance Studies at School of Arts & Aesthetics.

== Career ==
Mrityunjay's theatre career began in Patna while he was studying for his graduation. There he worked with several theatre groups like Prerna, Manch Art group, and Prangan in Patna. Later, he co-founded the group Abhiyan along with some like-minded friends. His love for theatre continued even after he shifted to New Delhi for his higher studies. Here he worked with famous groups like Rang Saptak, Bahroop and Dastak. Later he founded his own group named SEHAR in 2005 and continued to work rigorously. He received his training in dramaturgy from the leading figures of Indian Drama and Theatre through various workshops conducted by Habib Tanvir, B. V. Karanth, Prasanna, Ratan Thiyam, D. R. Ankur. He has worked with directors like D.R. Ankur, Lokendra Arambam, H. S. Shivaprakash, Surendra Sharma, Parvez Akhtar, Vijay Kumar, Javed Akhtar Khan, Suman Kumar and others. He has also worked as an actor, director, set designer, light designer and organiser for numerous theatre productions.

He is the founder-director of a theatre troupe, SEHAR (Society of Education, Harmony, Art, Culture and Media Reproduction) (registered under the Society Act) in 2007. He has directed more than two dozen plays among them Sabse Udas Kavita,

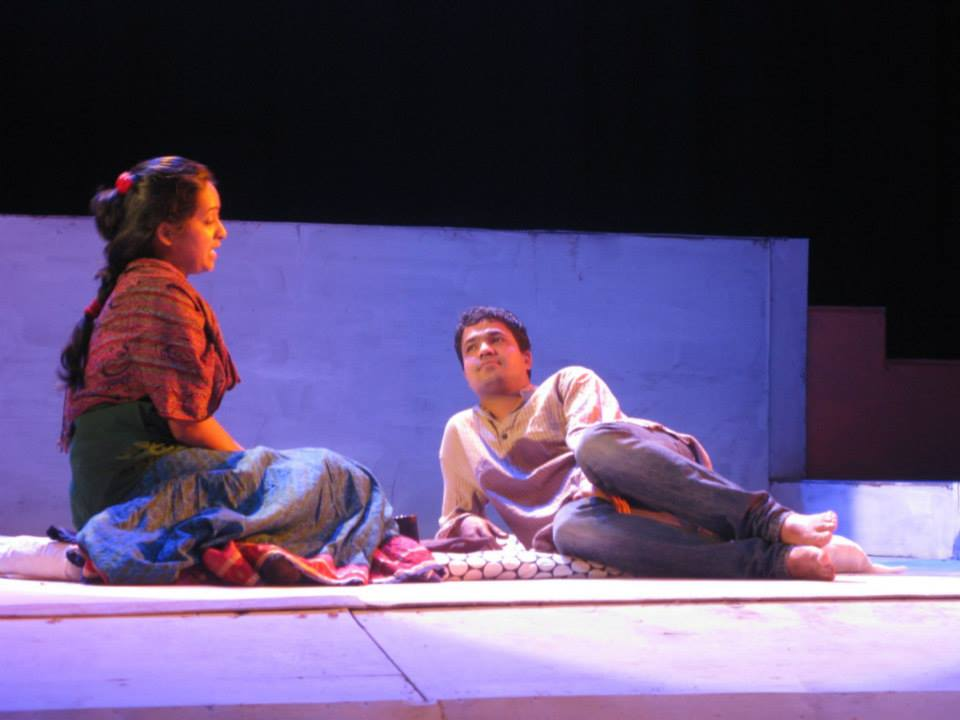
A scene of the play Sabse Udas Kavita

Khwahishen, Jee Humen to Natak Karna Hai, Dhruvswamini, Vithalala and Suicide have got special attention from the larger section of the society. He has also written plays like Aao Natak Natak Khelen, Khwahishen, Jee Humen to Natak Karna Hai, Suicide, Hey Ram, Teri Meri Kahani Hai, Karnav and others, which have been performed by groups and directors in various theatre centres of the country. He has adapted famous Keniyan playwright Ngũgĩ wa Thiong'o's play The Black Hermit as Jayen to Jayen Kahan. The adaptation was first performed by NSD (National School of Drama) graduate Randhir Kumar in 2005 in Patna. Later he reproduced the play in 2010 with SEHAR in Delhi. He has adopted H. S. Shivaprakash's famous Kannada play Mochi Madaiah in Hindi which was directed by Lokendra Arambam and published by Yash Publication, Delhi. An anthology on contemporary Indian theatre titled Samkaleen Rangkarm is also credited to him. His Hindi poetry collection Jo Mere Bheetar Hain was published by Sahitya Akademi, the Indian national academy of letters.

Presently, he is an assistant professor of drama and theatre arts in Visva-Bharati University, Santiniketan and manages his troupe SEHAR. He has also taught performing arts, communication and Indian aesthetics at IIT Mandi, IIMC, New Delhi, NCERT, New Delhi and College of Art, Delhi.

== Awards and recognition ==
He has been awarded Bihar Kala Samman by the Bihar government on the occasion of completion of hundred years of Bihar for his writings in the field of performing arts in 2012. He was awarded the Yuva Shabdsadhak Samman by the Hindi magazine Pakhi.

== Works ==
=== Plays ===
'Sadho Dekho Jag Baudana', 'Aao Natak Natak Khelen', 'Khwahishen', 'Jee Humen To Natak Karna Hai', 'Suicide', 'Hey Ram', 'Teri Meri Kahani Hai', 'Karnav', 'Jayen To Jayen Kahan', 'Mochi Madaiah',

=== Books ===
'Samkaleen Rangkarm', 'Jo Mere Bheetar Hain', 'Sadho Dekho Jag Baudana', 'Jayen To Jayen Kahan', 'Mochi Madaiah', 'Colonial/Postcolonial Bihar and Jharkhand'.

=== Poetry collection ===
'Jo Mere Bheetar Hain'

== See also ==
- Hindi theatre
- Theatre of India
