= Circle Theatre Company =

Indian theatre group

Circle Theatre Company is a theatre group in India. The group has its headquarters in Delhi.

== Background ==
Established in 2003, under the leadership of Bapi Bose, one of the directors in the contemporary Indian theatre, Circle Theatre is a professional theatre company.

== Productions ==
Parampurush (2008): Design and Direction - Bapi Bose A contemporary introspection of Sri Ramakrishna Paramhamsadev, the Great spiritual leader of 19th Century India, the embodiment of the harmony of world religions and Swami Vivekananda. The play looks into the man who could transform the mutual hatred to mutual love with the philosophy of Shiv Gyan Me Jeev Seva. Nothing could resist him to preach that Lord Shiva is living in the souls of every human being. Best Production of Sahitya Kala Parishad; Govt of NCT; Delhi, Participated in International Theatre Festival of National School of Drama - 10th Bharat Rang Mahotsav, 2008 as its venue opening production, Participated in Mohan Rakesh Theatre Festival as its opening production; organized by Sahitya Kala Parishad; Govt of NCT; Delhi, etc.

Julius Caesar Ke Aakhri Saat Din (Revival in 2008): Design and Direction - Bapi Bose A play against Autocracy, War in comparison to the sanctity of Democracy, based on the Great dictator Julius Caesar. It questions about the defense of the country, the society, the culture, the religion, the democracy, the independence and the human rights. But upon establishing in the power the leaders forget the welfare of the people and the society – the human rights are killed first instead. Then what is the way out of such predicament for human society? In the last 2000 years all ‘Caesars’ are busy building their ‘personal property much than anything else. Participated in International Theatre Festival of National School of Drama - 10th Bharat Rang Mahotsav, 2008, etc.

Pratham Parth (2006): Design and Direction - Bapi Bose The production based on the famous play written by Buddhadeb Bosu about the dexterous episode of Mahabharata and a subaltern introspection of Karna, the Great warrior. If Karna’s childhood would have been normal, well nurtured, the story of Mahabharata would have been different. The premise is it is a case of lost childhood so take care of your little child, don’t push them away. Best Production of Sahitya Kala Parishad; Govt of NCT Delhi, participated in International Theatre Festival of NSD - 9th Bharat Rang Mahotsav; 2007, participated in Best Plays of the Year, 2007 organized by Sahitya Kala Parishad; Govt of NCT; Delhi, etc.

Ekla Chalo Re (2004): Design and Direction - Bapi Bose A play on assassination of Mohandas Karamchand Gandhi and the following incidents of partition in the backdrop of Indian independence movement. Now half a century after that eventful moment we are once again at the arc of a dramatic historical moment where the divisive forces are raising their heads all over again. Introspection of those events in this dramatic work acts as a reminder for those who care for the unity of the country and for those who do not care. It talks about the communal harmony and the national integration. Best Production of Sahitya Kala Parishad; Govt of NCT Delhi, participated in International Theatre Festival - 7th Bharat Rang Mahotsav, 2005, participated in Best Plays of the Year, 2005 organized by Sahitya Kala Parishad; Govt of NCT; Delhi etc.

Julius Caesar Ke Aakhri Saat Din (2003): Design and Direction - Bapi Bose (See the Synopsis of 2006 Production) The production was presented on the occasion of 105th Birth Anniversary of Bertolt Brecht and 1st Anniversary of the organization.

Socrates (2002): Design and Direction - Bapi Bose This is a debut production, based on Socrates, the great philosopher. It’s a contemporary assessment of Autocracy, Freedom of Thought, Freedom of Expression and again upholding the sanctity of Democracy, law & judiciary, communal harmony and national integration. It had the honour of having the premier as the Venue Opening production at International Theatre Festival of National School of Drama - 4th Bharat Rang Mahotsav, 2002, etc.

seventeen july hindi natak: Design and Direction - Bapi Bose This production is based on Gujarat kand.

Mukti: Design and Direction - Kuldeep Kunal This is a production, based on Mukti bodh.

Ashadh Ka Ek Din (Hindi: आषाढ़ का एक दिन, One Day in Ashadh) is a Hindi play (2017): Design and Direction - Bapi Bose
