= Jairangam =

Theatre festival

Jairangam- Jaipur Theatre Festival is a theatre festival initiated in Jaipur, Rajasthan. It was established in 2001 by an NGO 3M Dot Bands and has now become one of the biggest theatre festivals of India.

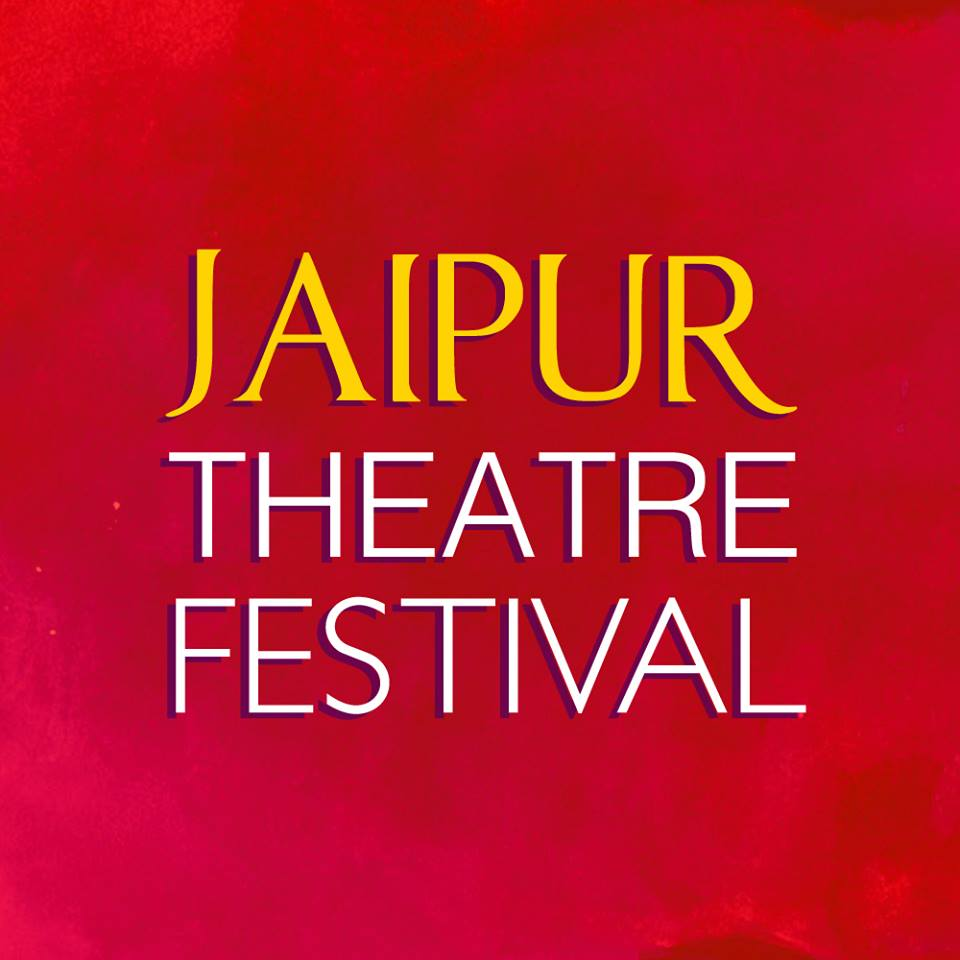
Logo

Leading theatre thespians and their groups have performed in Jairangam in last years. Global star Irrfan Khan who was born and brought up in Rajasthan, he has also been the face of Jairangam (in 2016), in an effort to show his support for theatre, the festival and his home state. Since the inception of Jairangam, the festival has orchestrated more than 200 plays and over 500 nukkad nataks. It has been a great platform where more than 2500 artists have shown their creativity and work.

== Founder ==
3M Dot Bands Theatre Family Society is an NGO registered under the Rajasthan Society registration Act 1958 and was established in 2001. It was founded by creative and avid theatre enthusiasts. They created an interactive platform for the regional National and International performers, actors, directors, storytellers, scriptwriters, technicians, and artists where they could share their values, expertise, professionalism, learnings, experiments etc. in front of a wide open relevant audience, to take their art form to the next level, keeping the global standards as benchmarks.

Their intent is to resurrect, rejuvenate and redefine the aura & importance around performing arts, theatre (rangmanch aka rang mandir) and connect with the classes and masses alike to keep them deep rooted within their elements. With an aim to sow and reap the benefits of this endeavor for generations to come. They have staged about 150 full house performances of different genre and are a leading theatre production house.

The theatre society is also actively involved in hosting workshops for theatre artists on a variety of subjects and technicalities of performing arts.

3 M Dot Bands theatre society is also known for raising its voice and creating awareness on different social issues like road safety, clean India etc. through theatre and street plays.

== History ==
The inaugural chapter of the Jaipur Theater Festival - Jairangam, took place in 2001. Recognizing a vacuum in quality theatrical activities, the founder – 3M Dot Bands envisioned a festival that would enliven and enrich the culture life of Jaipur to begin with. In the year 2012 ‘Jaipur Theatre Festival’ was re-christened as Jairangam (acronym of Jaipur Rang Mahostava).

Collectively, Jairangam tries to focus on new work also to reappraise Jaipur's exciting repertoire of plays with today's audience, thereby creating its own classics.

== Jairangam over the years ==
=== Jairangam 2012 ===
The inaugural festival was held from 19 to 25 November 2012 and featured Ratan Thiyam, Tripurari Sharma, Rajit Kapoor and Arvind Gaur.

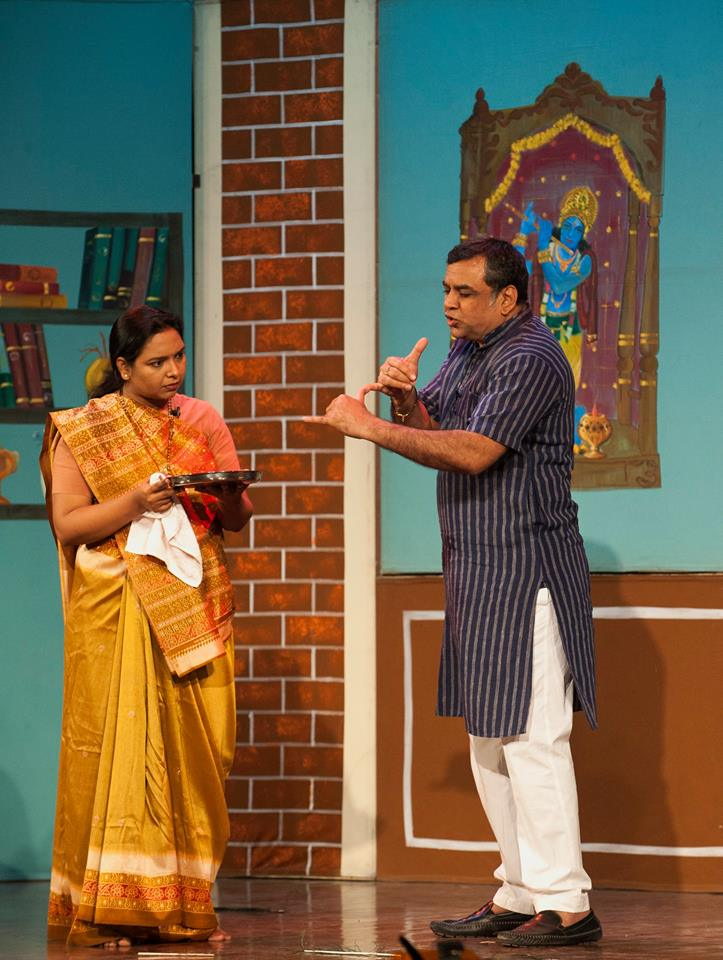
Paresh Rawal performing at Jairangam

=== Jairangam 2013 ===
The second edition of Jairangam was held between 15 and 22 December 2013 with 2 main venues, 14 plays, 17 street plays, 300 artists and 50000 viewers, the festival witnessed participation from personalities like Lushin Dubey, Rakesh Bedi, Arvind Gaur, Rasika Agashe, Rashi Bunny, Happy Ranjit, Farooq Sher Khan, Sameer Garur, Laeeq Hussian, Ashok Rahi, Sunita Tiwari, Ram Sahay Pareek.

=== Jairangam 2014 ===
The third year of the festival saw a total of 16 stage productions, staged from 8 to 15 December, which featured celebrated personalities like Kalki Koechlin, Makarand Deshpande, Rakesh Bedi, Avtar Gill, Manav Kaul, Aahana Kumra, Sunil Shanbag, Namit Das, Swanand Kirkire, Bharat Kapoor, Mansi Multani, Ishteyak Khan and Sanjay Dhadhich, Praveen Gunjan, Rajendra Payal, Narendra Gupta, Rasika Duggal, Ashok Banthia and also held Khushboo-e-Jaipur Photography Contest & Exhibition (10 to 12 December).

Along with this, one whole day was dedicated to solo performances and around 125 nukkad nataks were performed all over the city by Asmita Theatre Group.

=== Jairangam 2015 ===
The fourth edition was held from 4 to 11 October. It consisted of 24 proscenium plays, 11 solos, 200 jairangam nukkads. Along with this musical evenings, a food festival ‘Zayekedar’, a theatre conference and Rang Samwad were also organized during the festival week. Anupam Kher, Neena Gupta, Atul Kumar, Rakesh Bedi, Kalki Koechlin, Jim Sarbh, Sheeba Chaddha, Neil Bhoopalam, Tariq Vasudeva, Farrukh Sher Khan, Mohd. Zeeshan Ayyub, Ishteyak Khan, Shilpa Shukla, Makarand Deshpande, Ayesha Raza, Nivedita Bhattacharya, Yashpal Sharma, Dilnaz Irani, Kismat Bano, Ashok Rahi, Sunita Tiwari, Ram Sahay Pareek and RJ Naved were a part of the festival.

Held Khushboo-e-Jaipur Photography Contest & Exhibition (6-11 Oct 2015)

=== Jairangam 2016 ===
The fifth year of Jairangam had Irrfan as its brand ambassador. The festival was held from 21 to 28 November, at four different venues. It consisted of 33 plays, 50 shows, 200 nukkad nataks all over the city and Rang Samwad. Paresh Rawal, Meeta Vashisht, Parnab Mukherjee, Imran Rasheed, Sukant Goel, Gagan Dev Riar, Atul Satya Koushik, Puneet Issar, Manav Kaul, Kumud Mishra, Sudhir Pandey, Shilpi Marwaha, Avtar Gill, Rakesh Bedi, Anjan Shrivastava, Makarand Deshpande, Laxmi Narayan Tripathi, Ahlam Khan, Teddy Maurya were featured in the festival.

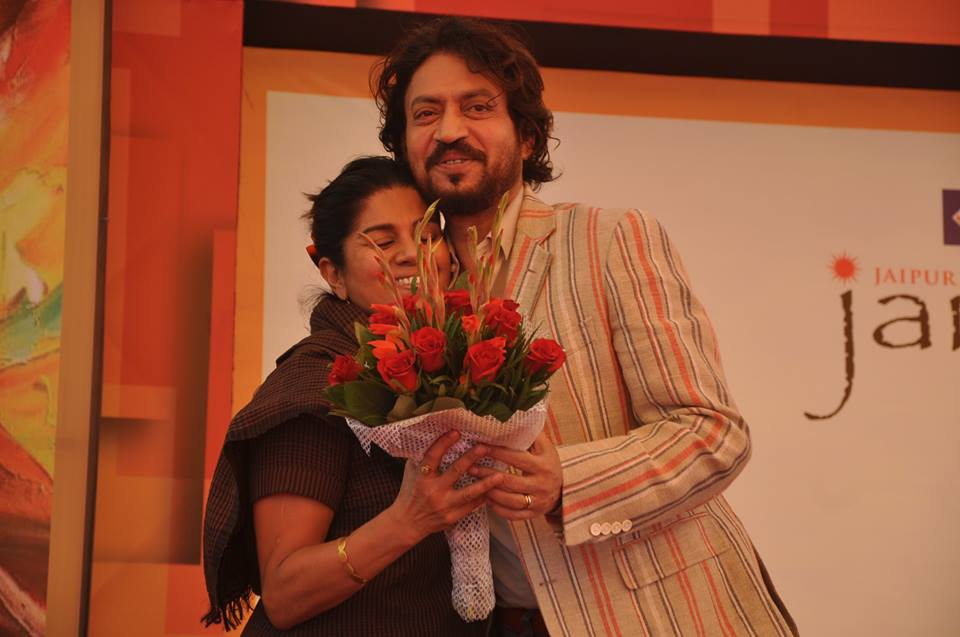
Mita Vashishth and Irrfan

=== Jairangam 2017 ===
The sixth edition of the festival was held from 3 to 10 December. Personalities like Makarand Deshpande, Sanjay Dhadhich, Nivedita Bhattacharya, Asseem Hattangady, Nitish Bhardwaj, Atul Satya Kaushik, Ishteyak Khan, Tripurari Sharma, Sadiya Sidiqui, Ranjit Kapoor and Padmashree Arjun Prajapti graced the festival.

=== Jairangam 2018 ===
The seventh edition of the festival saw 22 performances, panel discussions by some of the most celebrated theatre personalities like Mahesh Bhatt, Makarand Deshpande, Danish Hussain, Atul Kumar, Saurabh Shukla, Atul Satya Koushik, Sartaj Narain Mathur, Neil Bhoopalam, Anup Soni, Sadiya Siddiqui and Ajit Rai.

=== Jairangam 2019 ===
Jairangam was held from 23 to 29 November.

== Elements of Jairangam ==
Apart from bringing world class theatre to the people of Jaipur, the organizers also conduct an array of cultural activates to support the festival, some of these are:

=== Rang samwad ===
Panel discussion on various subjects of theatre, art, literature and their inter-relationships. Eminent panelist interact one-to-one with audiences, artists and theatre lovers.

=== Khushboo-e-Rajasthan ===
'Khushboo–e-Rajasthan’ is an online photography contest. The contest runs on Facebook as an event, where number of likes and the judges’ choice, is the criteria for award in different categories.

Art Strokes

A carnival of painting, sculptures, artisans and caricaturist decorated with live demonstration & workshops where eminent artist demonstrate their work live and also guide budding artists along with open discussion to enrich the young generation.

== Festival Venues in Jaipur ==
- Ravindra Manch
- Jawahar Kala Kendra
- Maharana Pratap Auditorium
- Birla Auditorium

== Impact ==
Jairangam began with a small team and limited resources, growing over time to host theatre and performing arts events in Rajasthan aimed at supporting actors, writers, researchers, and students.

Today Jaipur became a destination for festivals of art and culture and through the impact Jairangam has created and thus many young organizations and individuals are taking initiatives to produce and feature their work on different platforms.

Apart from this, team Jairangam is working on different social cause to raise their voice on issues matter in society through theatre performances, meetings, nukkadnatak etc.
