= Atul Satya Koushik =

Indian theatre artist (Born: 1985)

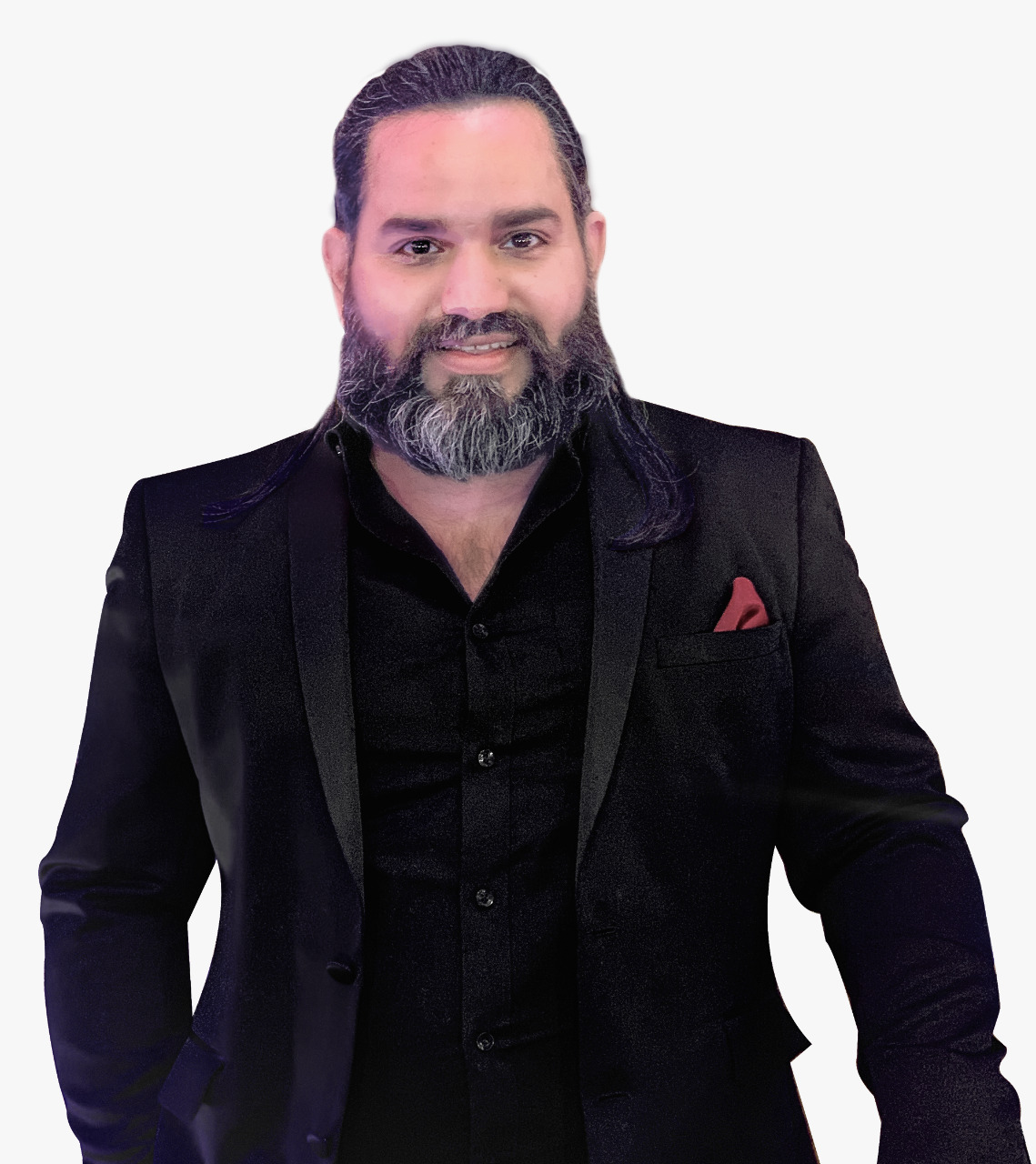
- Born: Atul Koushik; 2 July 1985 (age 41); Delhi, India
- Education: Shri Ram College of Commerce, Institute of Chartered Accountants of India, Faculty of Law, University of Delhi
- Spouse: Latika Jain

Atul Satya Koushik is an Indian theatre artist who works as a playwright, director, producer, and promoter.

Active for over a decade, he is known for creating large-scale stage productions featuring popular celebrities from Bollywood, television, and theatre. His plays often include elaborate sets, period costumes, and large casts. Koushik is an advocate for commercial theatre in India, having produced numerous ticketed shows that have drawn full houses.

After being denied admission to premier drama and film institutes in India, he established his own theatre company in Delhi in 2009. He has since collaborated with various producers to create impactful stage productions. Koushik's career path is notable for being unconventional, as he chose to pursue theatre despite having a prestigious education in finance and law.

== Education and early career ==
Koushik completed his senior secondary education in Commerce at Mother's Global School, Preet Vihar. He then attended Shri Ram College of Commerce at the University of Delhi, where he graduated with honors in Commerce. Following his undergraduate studies, he qualified as a Chartered Accountant and became a member of the Institute of Chartered Accountants of India. Additionally, he holds a law degree from the Faculty of Law, University of Delhi.

In his early thirties, he had written over 20 full-length plays, including notable works such as Chakrayuh, which marks Nitish Bharadwaj's return as Krishna, and Legend of Ram, featuring Arun Govil as Ram after three decades. Other plays include Ballygunge 1990 with Anup Soni, Raavan Ki Ramayan starring Puneet Issar, Pajama Party with Kamya Panjabi and Kavita Kaushik, Draupadi featuring Himani Shivpuri and Rakesh Bedi, Wo Lahore with Avtar Gill, Kahani Teri Meri with Kiran Kumar, Saudagar (an Indian adaptation of Shakespeare’s Merchant of Venice), Couple Trouble starring Kashmera Shah, Dad's Girlfriend, Bade Shahar Ke Log, Kaali Shalwar Aur Khushiya based on stories by Saadat Hasan Manto, Animal Farm by George Orwell, Temporary Matter, and several others. He has staged more than 1,000 performances of these plays, each distinct in content and treatment.

Koushik is part of a new generation of playwrights addressing the long-standing need for original Hindi plays in Indian theatre. With over 12 years of experience in the field, his involvement with theatre began in 2001. His notable contributions to original playwriting in India include Chakravyuh, Raavan Ki Ramayan, Draupadi, Dad's Girlfriend, and Wo Lahore. Additionally, he has produced significant adaptations of classic Indian and international literature, such as Kahani Teri Meri, Kaali Shalwar, and Animal Farm.

His plays inspired by mythology, such as Draupadi and Chakravyuh, have received acclaim for their performances across various parts of India. Koushik was invited by Lok Sabha Speaker Sumitra Mahajan to perform Chakravyuh at the Rajya Sabha Auditorium for the Members of the Indian Parliament.

Koushik's play Draupadi explores how the lives of 21st-century women parallel the experiences of the Panchal princess from the Mahabharata. Utilizing the dramatic device of a play within a play, the production features 11 female actors who depict this juxtaposition. The narrative centers on a group of Haryanvi women who, in the absence of men, perform the banned play Draupadi and discover parallels between Draupadi's life and their own. Veteran film and TV actor Rakesh Bedi also appears in this women-oriented production.

Koushik's play Wo Lahore portrays the internal conflicts of an ordinary Indian family against the backdrop of the freedom struggle and the societal impacts of the Partition. The play, which has been staged in over 10 cities including Lucknow, Chandigarh, Delhi, and Mumbai, features TV actor Avtar Gill in a cameo role.

Koushik was recently awarded the Saluting The Entrepreneurs Award by the Times Group for his excellence in the field of art and theatre. He demonstrated his organizational skills by founding The Films and Theatre Society in 2009, which encourages young professionals from various fields to participate in its activities. The group is known for organizing an annual festival of literature, films, and theatre in Delhi. Koushik has successfully built an audience for his shows, which are consistently performed to full houses.

== Plays ==
Year	Play	Capacity	Notes
2007	A Temporary Matter	Adaptation/Director/Producer	Based on a story by Jhumpa Lahiri
2010	Koobar Aur Kaaki	Adaptation/Director/Producer	Based on stories by Munshi Premchand and Dharamvir Bharati
2011	Arjun Ka Beta	Writer/Director/Producer	Decoding the philosophy of Chakravyuh from 13th day of the battle of Mahabharata
2011	Jamuna	Writer/Director/Producer	Story of a woman trying to keep her family intact in the highly volatile socio-political environment of undivided India of 1940s
2012	Living In	Writer/Producer	Ghosts of a young woman's disturbing past challenge her present love life
2012	Bade Shahar Ke Log	Writer/Director/Producer	Story of decaying morales of young aspiring writer in the fast-paced city of dreams, Mumbai
2012	Animal Farm	Adaptation/Director/Producer	Based on the famous novel by George Orwell by the same name. A satire of modern democracy.
2012	Kaali Shalwar	Adaptation/Director/Producer	Based on a story by Saadat Hasan Manto, exploring the dark corners of human desires.
2012	Saudagar	Adaptation/Director/Producer	An adaptation of Merchant of Venice, a tragic comedy by William Shakespeare.
2013	Bal Bhagwan	Director/Producer	Written by Swadesh Deepak, the play is a hard hitting commentary on superstitions and how fatal can they be.
2013	Draupadi	Writer/Director/Producer	All women from a family of traditional artists of Haryana decide to perform a banned play called Draupadi which was hitherto banned by the male folks of the family.
2014	Chakravyuh	Writer/Director/Producer	One of Atul's most successful play, which was an elevated version of his old play "Arjun Ka Beta". Yogiraj Krishna decodes the mystery of Chakravyuh of life for all generation to come.
2014	Couple Trouble	Writer/Director/Producer	An adaptation of a Marathi Play by C P Deshpande. Story of two couples seeking pleasure outside their marriages.
2015	Wo Lahore	Writer/Director/Producer	A revamped version of Atul's old play "Jamuna'. Love story of a freedom fighter during the times when struggle for freedom was at its peak.
2015	Kahani Teri Meri	Writer/Director/Producer	A revamped version of Atul's old play "Koobar Aur Kaai". An amalgamation of stories by Munshi Premchand and Dharamvir Bharati
2016	Raavan Ki Ramayan	Writer/Director/Producer	History's most revered villain Raavan tells the whole Ramayana from his own perspective.
2017	Dad's Girlfriend	Writer/Director/Producer	A love triangle with a difference where a middle aged man's young daughter and his young girlfriend fight for his love and attention.
2018	Lots of Love	Writer/Producer	A bouquet of five funny love stories with a top up of stand up comedy and live music.
2018	Ballygunge 1990	Writer/Director/Co-Producer	A gripping thriller full of vendetta but ultimately culminating as a compelling love story.
2019	Pajama Party	Writer/Director/Co-Producer	Four young women in metropolitan city lead the fight against urban rapes in the most maverick manner.
2019	The Legend of Ram	Writer/Director/Co-Producer	Journey of an ordinary man walking on the path of Dharma and Maryada and eventually attaining the status of greatest God of human civilisation i.e. Ram.
2022	My Wife’s 8th Vachan	Writer/Director	My Wife’s 8th Vachan is an eighty-five-minute comedy and family play inspired from marriages. The play is about the mystery called “marriage” that has deepened with each effort of solving it. This play, at most, is another ambitious (read failed) attempt at doing so.

== Awards and achievements ==
Best Theatre Director Award in Indian Global Star Awards.

RAI Vasundhara Ratna Award for his contribution in the field of theatre and art to be given in November 2017 by Respect Age International.

Times Entrepreneurship Award in the field of theatre by Times Group in 2016.

Best Performing Arts Promoter Award for his contribution in Indian Theatre by Abhinaya Rangmanch, Hissar in 2016.

Pioneer in Commercial Theatre Award by Artists' India in 2015.

Yuva Natya Nirdesak Puruskar by Sahitya Kala Parishad, Govt. of NCT of Delhi in 2013.

His play Ballygunge 1990 was officially selected and staged at the prestigious Bharat Rang Mahotsav organised by National School of Drama in February, 2020.

His plays have been performed at various prestigious festivals and venues, including the Jaipur Rang Mahotsav, Kala Ghoda Arts Festival, Bhartendu Natya Uysav, Yuva Satya Utsav, Parliament House Auditorium, and the residence of veteran Indian politician Lal Krishna Advani.

He is the only active playwright and theatre director in India who holds degrees in both Chartered Accountancy and Law.

== Books and published works ==
His play Chakravyuh has been published by Times Group Books in the form of a book in the year 2016. Foreword of this book has been written by Lal Krishna Advani. His other plays including "Raavan Ki Ramayan" and "Draupadi" are also under publication and will soon be available.
