= Bhoomika Theatre Group =

Indian Theatre group

Bhoomika Theatre group
- Bhoomika Theatre Group Logo

Comedy career
- Years active: 1989 - present
- Medium: Theatre
- Subject: art
- Website: http://bhoomika.in/

Bhoomika is an Indian Theatre group based in Hyderabad. It was founded in 1989 by Udaya Bhanu Garikipati. The group began its first production in 1989 with Kaki Bangaram, an adaption of Vijay Tendulkar's Pahije Jathiche. It later produced various original plays as well as adaptations in Telugu, Hindi and Deccani.

The Plays Kissa ek Ajnabhi Lash Ka, Jor Laga ke Haissa, Puthra Kameshti, Yamraj Bole Sou Saal Jiyo, Chawanny, Subbarao Ki Shahadat, a Hindi adaptation of Slavomir Mrozek’s Martyrdom Of Peter Ohey, Bharathendu Harischandra’s Andheri Nagari are some of the plays that were staged very successfully in Hyderabad, Gorakhpur, Dhanbad, Jamshedpur, New Delhi etc. Some of these plays have won appreciation from critics like Kavitha Nagpal, Jayadev Taneja.

G Udaya Bhanu, The president of Bhoomika was granted a Senior Fellowship in 1999 by Ministry of Human Resource Development for working on some of the folk forms of the region like Oggu Katha, Gollasuddulu, Baindla Katha, Chidathala Ramayanam, Jamukula Katha. This research work is aimed at further enriching the group with more and more folk inputs.

== History ==
Bhoomika Theatre Group (since 1989) started producing realistic plays, and then switched over to non realistic plays. Kaki Bangaram, Vijay Tendulkar’s PAHIJE JATHICHE, was the first step in that direction. Later in 1990 Mareechika, directed by G Udaya Bhanu, produced under Assistance To Young Theatre Workers scheme of Sangeet Natak Akademi, New Delhi, was the first of the group’s attempt to exploit the potential of the folk music . The play was a success, mainly because of the folk tunes that were used to enrich the production. Senior theatre persons like Sri BV Karanth appreciated the attempt. Another notable production of the group was Emo Gurram Eguravachu, an adaptation of Vijay Tendulkar’s realistic play Manus Navanche Bet.

Habib Tanveer’s Charandas Chor has used Bhojpuri folk tunes extensively and very successfully and is one of the major successes of the group. It got rave reviews in places like New Delhi, Varanasi.

Since 1989, the group has produced more than 12 plays in Hindi. Out of these plays very few were originally written in Hindi. Some of the classics and popular plays of Telugu were translated into Hindi, and were brought to the notice of non-Telugu speaking audience. Similarly, plays from different Indian languages were translated into Telugu.

Girish Karnad’s Nagamandala, Bertolt Brecht’s Insaan Ho Tho Leek Se Hato (Exception and The Rule), Manoj Mithra’s Raj Darshan and Badal Sircar’s Hattamla ke Us paar, Bertolt Brecht’s Insaan Ho Tho Leek Se Hato, a Hindi Adaptation of “ Exception and the Rule” are some of the important Hindi productions of the group.

Tella Sunna, Telugu adaptation of Bertolt Brecht’s Caucasian Chalk Circle, is another noteworthy production of the group. This play used the folk music of North Telangana, which made it easier for the audience to understand Brecht. The adaptation, the use of local folk music and some of the folk narrative and performative elements of folk forms like Chindu Bhagavatham has transformed the German play as an original Telugu play In Brechtian style. The play won both popular and critical applause.

Hart & Kauffman’s The Man Who Came to Dinner, an American comedy, was adapted into Telugu as O Cine Bhasmasura, is one of the very successful plays of the group. The play is a critique on the people, who are crazy about films and film personalities.

Charanadasu, a Telugu adaptation of Habib Tanveer’s Charanadas Chor, an adaptation of a classical Rajasthani folktale by Vijaydan Detha. It was produced in 1996 retaining the same Bhojpuri tunes, that were used in the version. The play won Nandi Awards for Second best play, Best Direction, Best music. The Government of Andhra Pradesh institutes these awards, These are considered to be the highest awards in the state.

“Droupadi” is a play drawn from the famous Kuppam Veedhinatakam Folk tradition and the play was produced by the group, with the help of Sri Ramachandra Rao, a veteran of the tradition. He trained the actors of Bhoomika and the play was performed for the urban audience of Hyderabad.

“Nagamandala “ a play by Sri Girish Karnad, Jnanapeeth Awardee was also produced by the group along with the youth of the Railway Degree College, Secunderabad as a part of a theatre work shop for the students of the college.

Maryada Ramanna, Memu atavikulam, Udutha Ramayanam, Azeer, Anjigadu, (an adaptation of Mahaswetha Devi’ s play), Moodo Kannu, Bullipetta Boochadu, Raachakoodu are some of the plays that were produced during the year 2004 – 2010.

In the year 2010, Bhoomika has taken up an important project with Surabhi, a family theater group with 150 years of history. The group started working with the youth of the Surabhi family (who are drifting away from theater due to various reasons) and in the course of a workshop produced Charanadasu in the month of March 2010. The group is making serious efforts to evolve the youth into a professional theatre group to cater to the needs of the modern audience.

Gopatrudu is a celebrated novel written by KNY Patanjali in 1994. It is a satirical take on the present-day society, institutions, leaders and values. It was dramatized and directed by Udaya Bhanu Garikipati, and was staged in Tatiparti, East Godavari district in 2009. The play was revived by Bhoomika in 2011 and 2018.

Baribattala Raju is a telugu adaptation of Nanga Raja written by Badal Sircar. It was translated to Telugu by Samyukta. Bhoomika had many successful shows of Badi Battala Raju along with the Hindi version Nanga Raja.

Bari Battala Raju has been performed in different places in Telangana and Andhra Pradesh and has received great response. Manish, has received multiple awards as an actor in different statewide competitions.

== Mungitlo Natakam ==
Mungitlo Natakam or Theatre at your doorstep is an initiative by Bhoomika theatre group. The initiative gives an opportunity to the colonies and gated communities to invite the group to their space and perform for free. The main goal of this initiative is to show the taste of live theatre to the next generation of audience. It was first started by the group in 2004. Over a two-year period, the theatre team went to different localities in Hyderabad and performed plays in residential areas. The group performed nearly 30 shows and it was a huge success. It was disbanded due to logistical reasons. It was revived again in 2019.

== Theatre for young Audience ==
Bhoomika is very passionate about doing theatre for children.

Bhoomika is associated with ASSITEJ. As part of that, Assitej India has organised International Theatre Festival for Children and Young audience since 2014. TIFLI Hyderabad is organised in association with Bhoomika to engage and enlighten children and spread the awareness about Theatre for Young Audience (TYA). Bhoomika has organised TIFLI 4 times from 2014 to 2017. There were performances of mime, magic, music, dance, puppets, storytelling, and stand up comedy along with theatre plays for children. Here the adults performed for children and young adults. This kind of theatre, developed by adults for children, helps to get closer to them and address some of their issues. This was taken up by Bhoomika to spread information about theatre for young audiences among schools and theatre practitioners in Hyderabad.

In November 2022, Bhoomika theatre group, Telangana Pollution control board, Telangana Biodiversity board and Ecofolks jointly organised the First Telangana state Green theatre festival at the Bhaskara Auditorium, BM Birla Science museum, Khairtabad. An inter-school drama competition was organised.

== Productions ==
YEAR	NAME	LANGUAGE	WRITER	DIRECTOR	
1989	Kaki Bangaram	Telugu	S. Hanumantha Rao	Udaya Bhanu G	An adaptation of Vijay Tendulkar’s Marathi play “Pahije Jathiche”. Adapted to Telugu by S. Hanumantha Rao.
1989	Chal Chal Gurram	Telugu	Tanikella Bharani	Udaya Bhanu G	
1990	Mareechika	Telugu	Sivajee	Udaya Bhanu G	Produced under Sangeetha Nataka Akademi’s scheme of “Assistance to Young Theatre Workers”.
1990	Kissa Ek Ajnabi Laash Ka	Hindi	Md. Afzaluddin	Udaya Bhanu G	Deccani adaptation of a popular Telugu play by M.Diwakar Babu
1991	Emo Gurram Egara Vachu	Telugu	Jagannath	Udaya Bhanu G	An adaptation of Vijay Tendulkar’s “Manus Navanche Bet” .
1991	Jor Laga Ke Haissa	Hindi	Md Abdulla	Udaya Bhanu G	An adaption of a popular Telugu Play 'Rayi" Written by A. Gopala Raju. Adapted to Hindi by Md. Abdulla.
1991	58 Not Out	Hindi	Udaya Bhanu G	Udaya Bhanu G	
1991	Gandhi Darshan	Telugu			
1991	Yamaraj Bole Sou Sal Jiyo	Hindi	Udaya Bhanu G	Udaya Bhanu G	The play aims at propagating better awareness about industrial safety among workers.
1991	Mahanagaram	Telugu	D. S. N. Murthy	Udaya Bhanu G	The troubles of the citizens’ of concrete jungles are the subject matter of the play.
1992	Puthra Kaamesthi	Hindi	Ganesh Pathro	Udaya Bhanu G	A very popular Telugu play written by Ganesh Pathro is about family planning.
1993	Swathanthra Samara Bheri	Telugu	Udaya Bhanu G	Udaya Bhanu G	Produced on the occasion of the golden jubilee celebrations of Quit India movement.
1993	Andheri Nagari	Hindi	Bharatendu Harischandra	Udaya Bhanu G	Bharatendu Harischandra has written the play during the days of freedom struggle.
1994	Dammit Katha Addam Thirigindi	Telugu	Yendamuri Veerendranath	Chatla Sri Ramulu	
1993	Chawanny	Hindi	Udaya Bhanu G	Udaya Bhanu G	
1993	Oh Cine Bhasmasura	Telugu	Udaya Bhanu G	Udaya Bhanu G	
1994	Aruna	Telugu	V.Rajeev, Gudipati Venkata Chalam	Naripatta Raju	
1994	Tella Sunna	Telugu			
1995	Subbarao Ki Shahadath	Hindi			
1996	Charandas Chor	Hindi	Habib Tanvir	Udaya Bhanu G	
1996	Raj Darshan	Hindi	Manoj Mitra	Udaya Bhanu G	
1997	Charanadasu	Telugu	Habib Tanvir	Udaya Bhanu G	
1997	Insaan Ho Tho Leek Se Hato	Hindi	Bertolt Brecht	Udaya Bhanu G	An Adaptation of Brecht’s “Exception and the Rule”. Adapted to Telugu by Udaya Bhanu G.
1997	Nagamandal	Hindi	Girish Karnad	Udaya Bhanu G	
1998	Nandanvanam	Telugu	Udaya Bhanu G	Udaya Bhanu G	The play is commissioned by People’s Initiative Network, an NGO, working with slum dwellers of Twin Cities.
1999	Hattamala Ke Us Par	Hindi	Badal Sircar	Udaya Bhanu G	
2000	Dibba Desam Dataaka	Telugu	Badal Sircar	Udaya Bhanu G	A telugu adaption of Hattamala ke us par by Badal Sircar. Adapted to telugu by Udaya Bhanu G.
2001	Esuromani Manushulunte	Telugu	Udaya Bhanu G	Udaya Bhanu G	
2003	Droupadi	Telugu	Udaya Bhanu G	Udaya Bhanu G	
2004	Maryada Ramanna	Telugu	Nyayapathi Raghava Rao	DV Sridhar	
2004	Udatha Ramayanam	Telugu	Udaya Bhanu G	Udaya Bhanu G	
2005	Azeer	Hindi	Swapan Mondal	Swapan Mondal	
2006	Behula Ek Nadi Ka Naam	Hindi	Swapan Mondal	Swapan Mondal	
2006	Memu Atavikulam	Telugu	DV Sridhar	Swapan Mondal	
2006	O Cine Bhasmasura	Telugu	Hart and Kaufman	Udaya Bhanu G	
2007	Anjigadu	Telugu	Udaya Bhanu G	Udaya Bhanu G	
2008	Moodokannu	Telugu	Udaya Bhanu G	Udaya Bhanu G	
2009	Bullipette Boochadu	Telugu	Udaya Bhanu G, Balleda Narayanamurthy	Udaya Bhanu G	
2010	Badarika Vanam	Telugu	Udaya Bhanu G	Udaya Bhanu G	Based on Jataka Tales
2010	Charanadasu	Telugu	Habib Tanwir	Udaya Bhanu G	Adapted to Telugu by Udaya Bhanu G
2011	Gopathrudu	Telugu	KNY Patanjali	Udaya Bhanu G	Dramatised and directed by Udaya Bhanu G
2013	Gaddi Karichina Desam	Telugu	Unknown	Swapan Mondal	Based on an Asian Folk Tale. Adapted by Udaya Bhanu G
2014	Edu Chepala Katha	Telugu	Udaya Bhanu G	Udaya Bhanu G	
2015	Sampangi	Telugu	Grimm Brothers	V Krishna Prasad	
2106	Vihanga Prasthanam	Telugu	Rabindranath Tagore	Udaya Bhanu G	Adapted to telugu by Udaya Bhanu G
2017	Chal Chal Gurram	Telugu	Tanikella Bharani	Udaya Bhanu G	
2018	Gopathrudu	Telugu	K.N.Y.Patanjali	Udaya Bhanu G	
2019	Bullipette Boochadu	Telugu	Udaya Bhanu G	Udaya Bhanu G	
2019	Kundeti Kommu	Telugu	M Diwakar Babu	Udaya Bhanu G	Has also been performed more than 10 times as a part of Mungitlo Natakam.
2020	Charanadasu	Telugu	Habib Tanwir	Udaya Bhanu G	
2021	Dibba desam dataaka	Telugu	Badal Sircar	Udaya Bhanu G	A telugu adaption of Hattamala ke us par by Badal Sircar. Adapted to telugu by Udaya Bhanu G.
2022	Baribattala Raju	Telugu	Badal Sircar	Rajeev Ranjan	
2022	Nanga Raja	Deccani	Badal Sircar	Rajeev Ranjan	
2023	Chal Chal Gurram	Telugu	Thanikella Bharani	Udaya Bhanu G	
2023	Kundeti Kommu	Telugu	M Diwakar Babu	Udaya Bhanu G	

== Training ==
In addition to producing plays, the group also conducts theatre workshops for children and youth. These workshops are held in schools, colleges and also slums. They are mainly aimed at improving the communicative skills, sensibilities and thereby understanding their own selves and also the society around them. Theatre games and techniques are used as a tool to improve the personalities than to train them as performers. As a follow up to these workshops, for those who are interested in theatre, weekly theatre classes are held every Sunday.

In 2011, Bhoomika in collaboration with National School of Drama, organised a theatre workshop for the younger generation of Surabhi theatre group to encourage them to stick with theatre as a mainstream profession. The workshop introduced the modern techniques of theatre to its participants.

Apart from this, Bhoomika also offers a three month actor's training program. After which the trained actors perform in various venues across the twin cities.
