= Yours Truly Theatre, Bengaluru =

Yours Truly Theatre is an improvisational comedy and interactive theatre group established in 2003 and based in Bangalore, India.

It is currently run by Nandini Rao who is also the co-founder and artistic director of the group. In 2012 the group performed & conducted theatre workshops at Edinburgh fringe theatre festival, European Theatre festival, Bhartiya Vidya Bhavan, London to The Hague, Zurich, Berlin, Paris, ending the tour at Milan.

The group was featured on BBC & PRI'S The World & Nandini Rao was also selected as the finalist of YCE - Young Creative Entrepreneur Award by British Council.

== Styles ==
The group specialises in varied styles of theatre including:

- Complete the Story Style
- Playback Theatre
- Body Theatre
- Silent Theatre
- Improv
- Rough Theatre
- Gripps Theatre
- Forum Theatre

== Shows ==
YT Productions include

- Bhagwan Dhundoo
- Last Production:

Bhagwan Dhundoo, Common Man and "Final Touches" were done in "Complete the story" style. Here the audience get to end a "scripted story" together and the actors act it out without any discussion. Final Touches had four plays done in four different languages and travelled across Bangalore and Mysore.
