= Festival of Chariots =

Krishna Ratha Yatra festivals

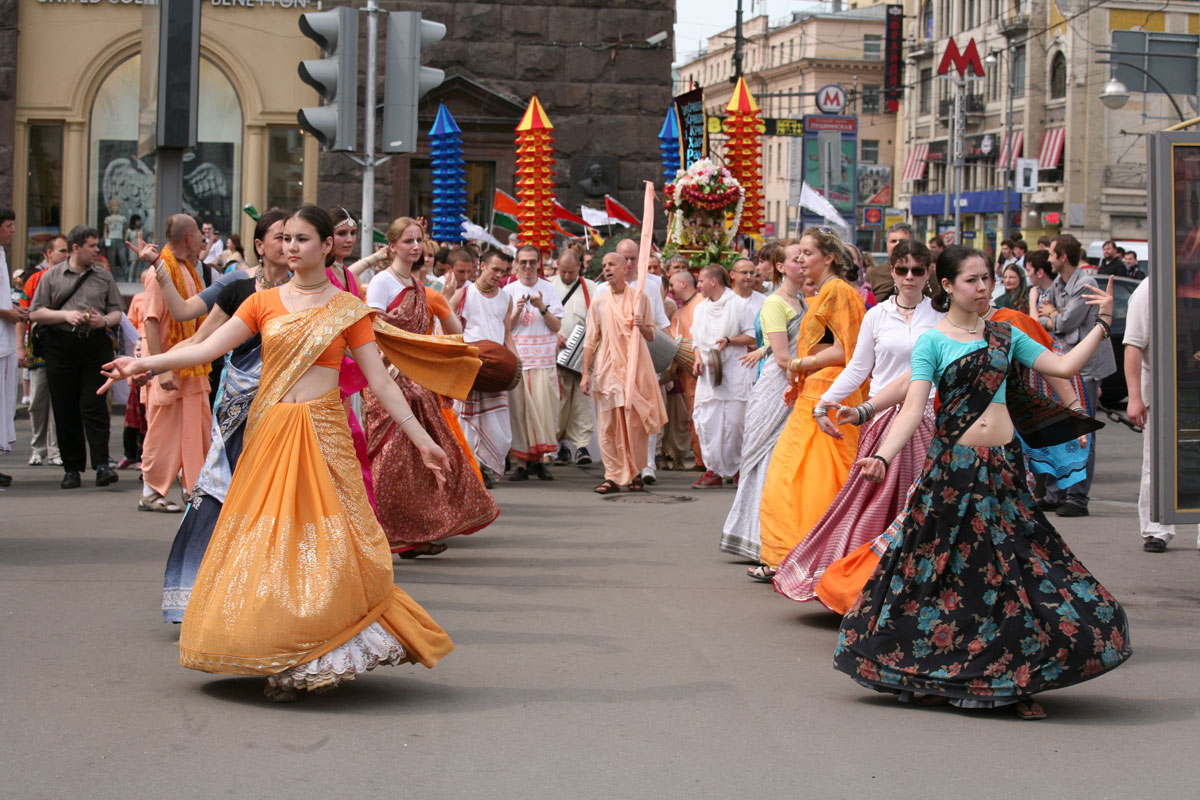
Members of Hare Krishna parading on the streets of Russia

Festival of Chariots refers to the Ratha Yatra festivals run by the International Society for Krishna Consciousness (ISKCON). The main event is a chariot procession through the streets. The procession may then be followed by performing arts presentations on the stage and visiting various booths encamped at a park site. The festivals involve chants, the arts, music, and free vegetarian feasts that can be seen over the world but specifically in the United States (birthplace of ISKCON). ISKCON, commonly referred to as Hare Krishna is a branch of Hindu religiosity. ISKCON have used the practice of Hindu festivals as an important element of Hare Krishna expression, and is a recognisable feature of their appearance in the public realm. Kirtan is an element that is common to all ISKCON festivals. Kirtan is a process of musical worship, that is accessible for group participation and as described by Edwin Bryant as “Krishna in vibratory form”. The practice of kirtan are melodies, mantras, spiritual texts that proclaim God's name in his many forms.

== Ratha Yatra ==
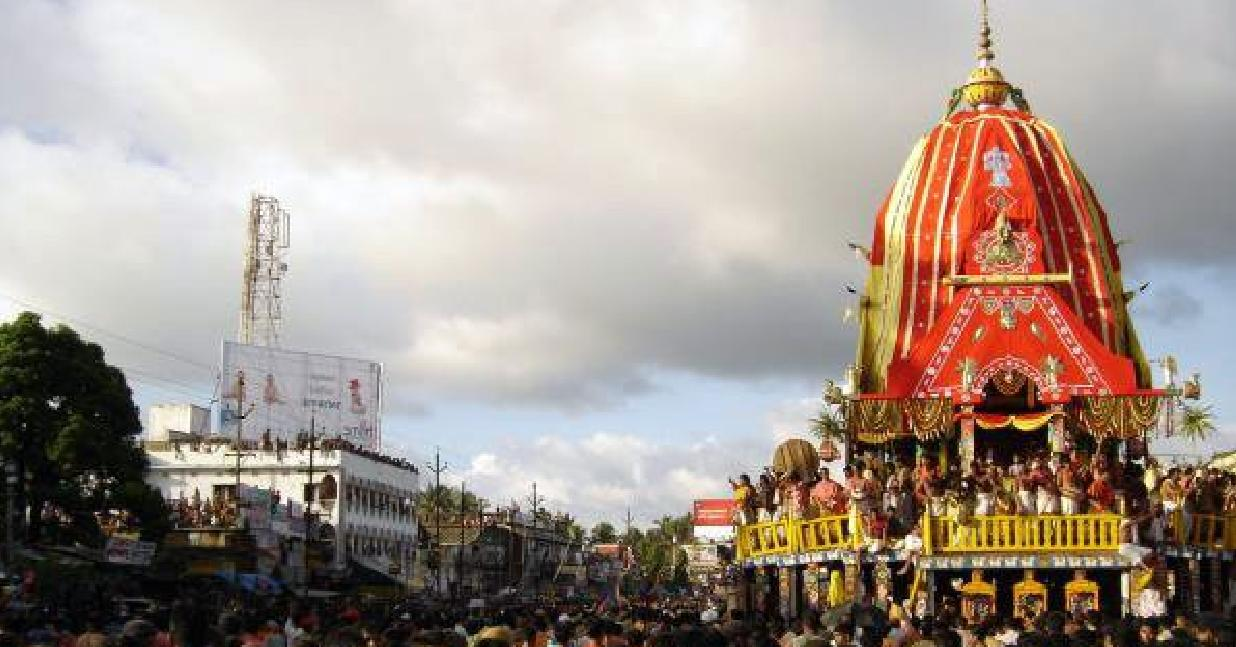
Chariot being pulled by Devotees

The festival of Chariots originated in India in a city called Jagannatha Puri. The festival has been used in Vishnu-related traditions in Hinduism along with other traditions such as Daoism. The festival celebrates Lord Krishna return to Vrindavan. Vrindavan is a town in the Mathura district of Uttar Pradesh, India however it is also a symbolic as an eternal spiritual place which encumbers everything and is transcendental. To go to Vrindavan is the act of seeing God himself, as you are enveloped by them. Vrindavan is where Krishna returned, but Vrindavan is also Krishna himself. This tradition of using a chariot in public procession is an ancient tradition, common in many Asian traditions. The pulling of the chariot symbolises the pulling of the lord into one's heart.

=== World-wide example ===
The festival of the chariots is now celebrated world-wide, in nearly every major city. The event causes a city-wide interruption as the festival draws in thousands of people to participate. In 2017 procession wooden carts were rolled through the streets accompanied by the ISKCON chant; “Hare krishna, hare krishna, krishna krishna, hare hare…”. Food and music are essential parts of the festival, as in many ISKCON festivals. Vegetarian food is usually supplied during the festival and well as information on how to become part of the community. The festivals display a connectivity of Indian culture and ethically non-Indian population.

== Controversy ==
Notable points of controversy include:

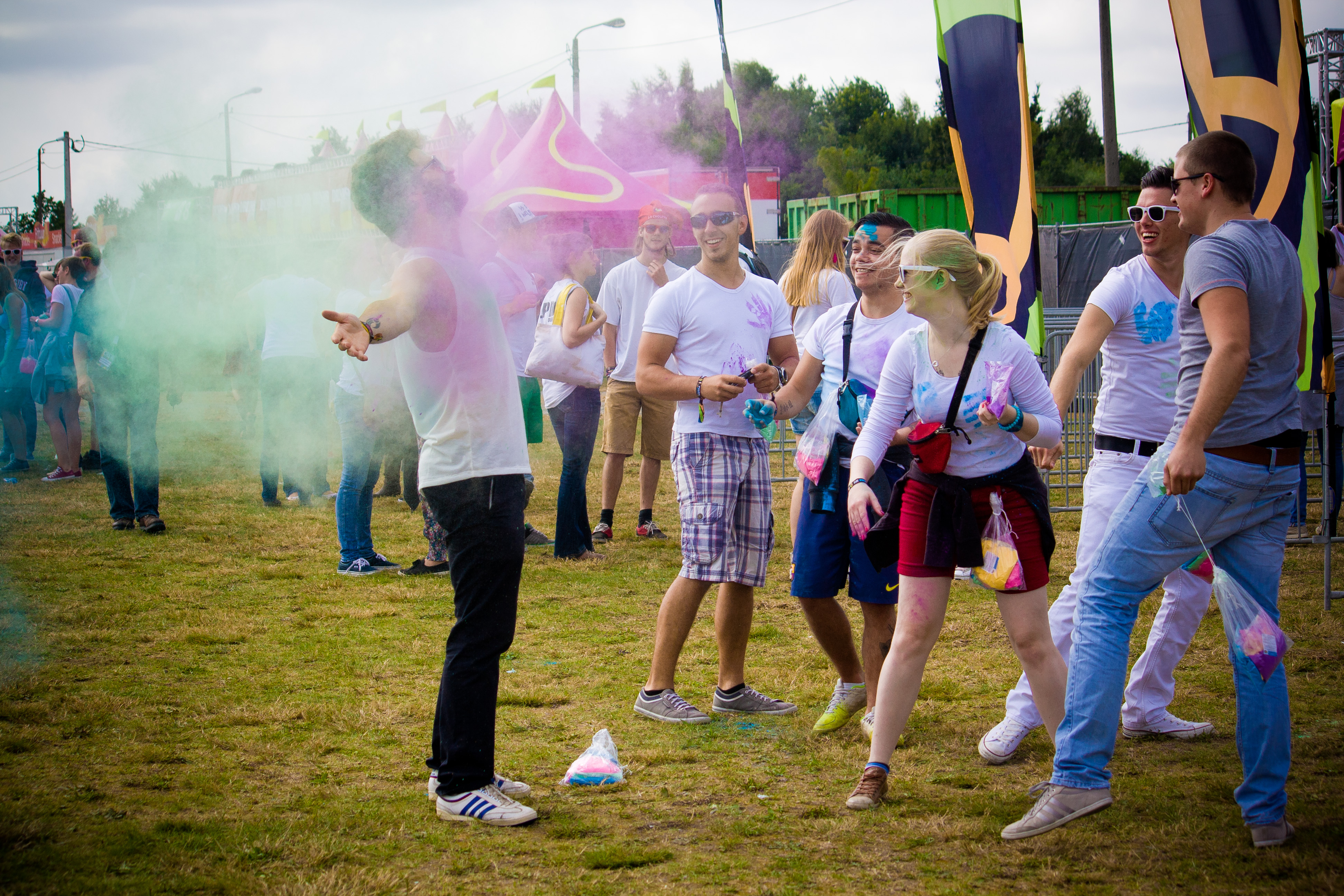
People throwing paint

- Cultural tension these festivals have caused outside India. In Singapore the state has been historically hostile towards members of ISKCON. The practice of festival, central to their beliefs, has had to be practiced in different ways such as in personal houses, farms or stadiums. ISKCON expression has taken a different mode when interacting with its culturally situated surroundings.
- Some believe that the festival has been stripped of its religious value by spectators who participate for non-religious recreational purposes. This specifically relates to Holi ‘the festival of colours’.
