= Platform for Action in Creative Theater =

Indian theatrical circle

Platform for Action in Creative Theater (PACT) is in Indian theatrical circle involved in Theatrics, Arts, and Cultural Management. It works as a facilitating platform for potential theater actors and directors.

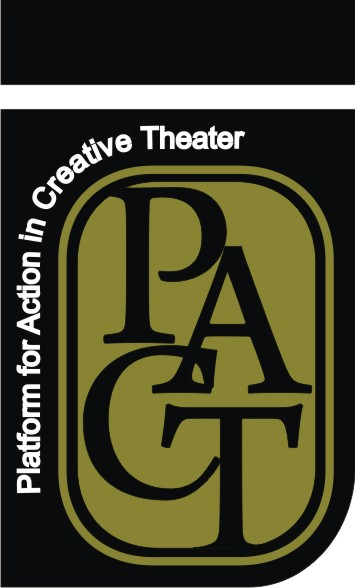
PACT Logo

== Dramaturgy ==
- Six characters in search of an Author, Directed by Dr. Ann Elizabeth Armstrong, Miami University, 2003.
- Little Clay Cart, directed by Dr. Howard Blanning, Miami University, 2003

They are involved in implementing awareness programs for Delhi Metro commuters about etiquette of commuting and about various security issues.
