= Ramesh Mehta (playwright) =

Rameshwar Nath Mehta (7 August 1923 – 29 May 2012) was an Indian playwright, director, actor and translator.

== Biography ==
Mehta moved to Delhi in 1942 in search of a job after his graduation. His farce Under Secretary has been translated into many Indian languages, including Tamil, Malayalam, Sindhi, Bengali, and Gujarati. Mehta was awarded the Sangeet Natak Akademi Award for acting in 2007. Mehta died on 29 May 2012, at the age of 88.
