= Bansi Kaul =

Indian writer and theatre director (1949–2021)

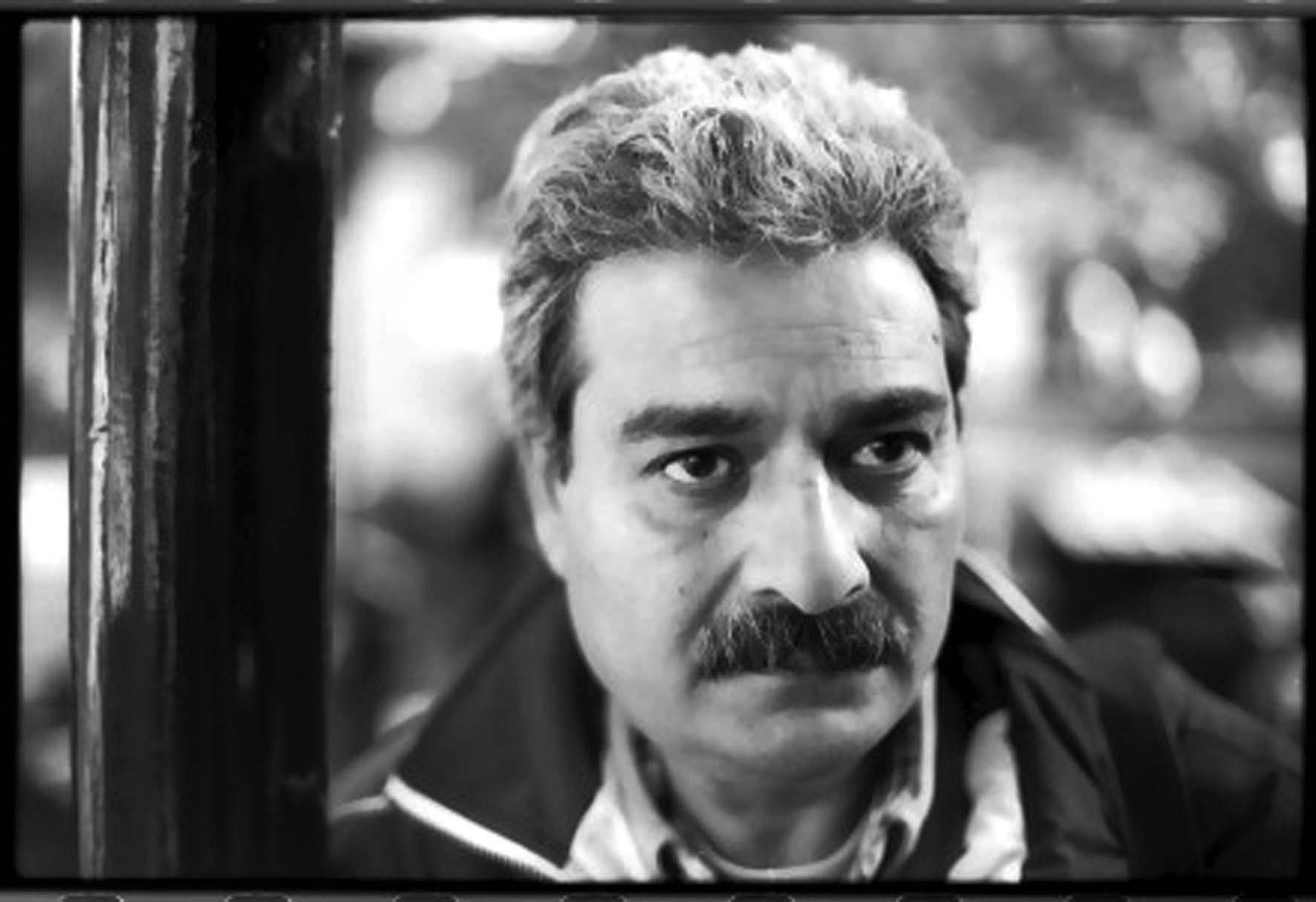
- Bansi kaul in 2000
- Born: 23 August 1949; Srinagar, Jammu and Kashmir, India
- Died: 6 February 2021 (aged 71); Dwarka, Delhi, India
- Years active: 1974–2020
- Awards: Sangeet Natak Akademi Award (1995); Padma Shri (2014)

Bansi Kaul (23 August 1949 – 6 February 2021) was an Indian theatre director and the founder of Rang Vidushak, a theatre group in Bhopal. He was a recipient of the Padma Shri, India's fourth highest civilian honor, in 2014, and the Sangeet Natak Akademi Award in 1995. Some of his notable plays included Aala Afsar, Kahan Kabir, and Sidhi Dar Sidhi urf Tukke pe Tukka. He was a designer and associate show director for the 2010 Commonwealth Games opening ceremony and also the art director for the 1986 and 1987 Khajuraho Festival.

== Early life ==
Bansi Kaul was born on 23 August 1949 into a Kashmiri Pandit family in Srinagar, Jammu and Kashmir, India. He was interested in art and painting from an early age. He was exposed to amateur theater groups in Kashmir. He moved to New Delhi to join the National School of Drama (NSD), but, did not qualify for the first time, before successfully retrying. He graduated from the institute with a specialization in stagecraft in 1973.

== Career ==
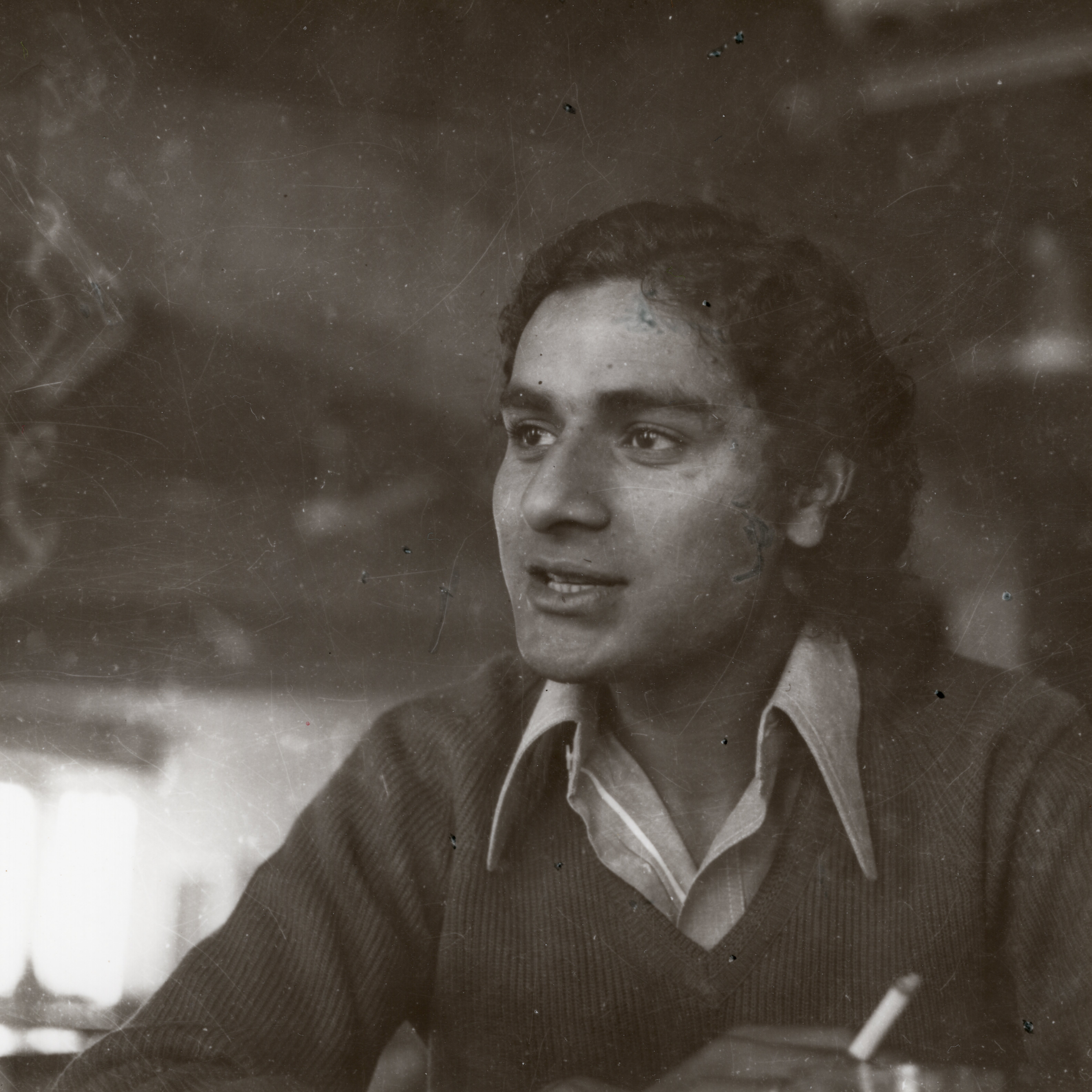
Bansi Kaul in 1976.

Kaul started his career as a director with National School of Drama's NSD Repertory Company and was also a member of the faculty of the school's department of extension, before forming his own theatre group in 1984. In 1986, he founded Rang Vidushak, a theater group based in Bhopal, that incorporated folk idioms into its production and evolved a new idiom of clown-theatre. The group performed in India and abroad in several languages such as Hindi, Punjabi, Sanskrit, Tamil and Sinhalese.

Kaul directed and produced over 100 plays through his career, with some of his notable plays included Aala Afsar based on Nikolai Gogol's satirical play The Government Inspector, Kahan Kabir based on the collected works of poet-saint Kabir, and Sidhi Dar Sidhi urf Tukke pe Tukka an adaptation of Chinese folktale "Three promotions in succession". Most of his plays were based on the Nautanki style of street theater. Other works included Mrichakatikam, Raja Agnivarna ka Pair, Agnileek, Veini Samhaar, Dashkumar Charitham, Sharvilk, Pancharathram, Andha Yug, Khel Guru Ka, Jo Ram Rachi Raakha, Aranyadhipathi Tantyamaama, Zindagi aur Zyonk, Vatan ka Raag, and Saudagar. In a review of a retrospective of his works Rang-Bansi (transl. Colors of Bansi), newspaper The Hindu wrote, "As a designer, he (Kaul) treads two worlds – the designer of mega events with plenty of resources and the designer of the theatrical productions suffering from utter paucity of funds."

Through his works, he explored the politics of laughter and studied riddles and myths across Indian traditional folk tales, including clowns, or Vidushak, into the central figure of his works. His last production Paglaye Gusse Ka Dhuan in 2019 was for the Lucknow based Bhartendu Natya Akademi. The play was based on the works of Kashmiri poets and addressed the topic of Exodus of Kashmiri Pandits during years of militancy in the state.

Building on his training in stagecraft, he worked as the art director for the 1986 and 1987 Khajuraho Festival and also for the Festival of India in China, Switzerland, and the USSR. Kaul was one of the lead designers and an associate show director for the 2010 Commonwealth Games opening ceremony. Speaking about his mandate, he would say that the requirement was to bring Indian culture and themes to the event, without letting Bollywood come across as the "only cultural identity of the country".

He was awarded the 1995 Sangeet Natak Akademi Award and the Padma Shri, India's fourth highest civilian honor in 2014. He was also the recipient of the 2016 Rashtriya Kalidas Samman for Kahan Kabir. He received the 1994 Shikhar Samman from the Government of Madhya Pradesh, and the 1995 Safdar Hashmi Award from the Uttar Pradesh Sangeet Natak Akademi.

== Personal life ==
Kaul was married to theater artist Anjana Puri. Puri was a Sangeet Natak Akademi Awardee herself and composed music for many of his productions.

Kaul died from cancer on 6 February 2021, in Delhi. He was 71.
