= Surabhi (theatre group) =

Theatre group

Surabhi (also known as Sri Venkateswara Surabhi Theatre) is a family operated nomadic theatre group that originated in 1885 in Surabhi Reddivaripalli, a village in Kadapa district, Andhra Pradesh. Founded by Vanarasa Govinda Rao and Vanarasa Chinna Ramaiah, the ensemble initially evolved from Tholu Bommalata (traditional shadow puppetry) before transitioning into live stage dramas. The surviving families currently are based in Hyderabad, Telangana, India. The group performs plays based on stories from Hindu mythology and the Puranas.

== History ==
The Surabhi theatre group was formed by two brothers, Vanarasa Govinda Rao and Vanarasa Chinna Ramaiah, in 1885 in Surabhi Reddivaripalli, a village in the Kadapa district of Andhra Pradesh. Govinda Rao's adopted father was involved with the traditional shadow puppetry of Andhra Pradesh, tholu bommalata. After his death, Rao took over the group, gradually replacing the puppets with live actors.

In 1885, Govinda Rao was invited to host a live drama at a wedding by the elders of Surabhi. His acting troupe performed the play Keechaka Vadham, traditionally depicted using leather puppets, as a live drama. Women also performed in the plays, which was unheard of at the time.

Govinda Rao had a family of three sons and ten daughters. Except the eldest son, all the others spent their lives in the theatre and were trained for it. When the family started growing in numbers, the daughters with their husbands began establishing their own theatre groups, reaching up to 50, before dwindling to five in 2003. The biggest of these sub-groups was established in 1937 by Subhadramma, Govinda Rao's fifth daughter, and her husband R. Venkatarao, named Sri Venkateshwara Natya Mandali, in Jimidipeta village of Srikakulam district of Andhra Pradesh. Subhadramma specialised in doing male roles, particularly characters like Duryodhana in Mahabharata. She was awarded the title of 'Kala Praveena' by Sangeeta Nataka Akademi of Andhra Pradesh. In addition, both the husband and wife received many honors from various organizations of the state. Following their death, their sons managed the theatre.

Under the direction of B. V. Karanth, the organization performed three plays: Bhishma (1996), a Telugu adaptation of Dwijendralal Ray's play of the same name, organized by the National School of Drama; Chandi Priya (1997), which spoke for women's rights and capabilities, by Alarippu, a New Delhi-based organization; and Basthi Devatha Yaadamma, an adaptation of The Good Person of Szechwan by Bertolt Brecht, in 1998. Karanth directed and also composed music for all three plays.

The group live together and travel from place to place to perform in specially erected halls. The group stays at each place for three months to a year, depending on public response. As a repertory group, they present 26 plays.

== Achievements ==
- Surabhi Theatre's Sri R.Nageswara rao (babji) was awarded the Padma Shri in 2013.
- Surabhi's 6th-generation director Sri Surabhi Jayachandra Varma received the Ustad Bismillah Khan Yuva Puraskar Award in 2016 from Sangeet Natak Akademi, New Delhi.

== Performances ==
- Participated 5 times in Bharat Rang Mahotsav, presented by NSD New Delhi and the 15th Bharat Rang Mahothsav
- Aaderanjali Theatre Festival, B.V. Karanth Smruthi Samaroh, Bharath Bhavan, Bhopal (2014)
- Shri Keremaner Shambu Hegde "Rashtriya Natyothsava" - 4 and 5 (two times), Gunavanthe, Karnataka state
- Bahurupi Theatre Festival, Mysore (2014)
- Mudradi Theatre Festival, Mudradi, Udipi, Karnataka (2014)
- In May 2013, the group played outside India for the first time, with performances at theatre festivals in Paris and Metz.
- Sangeet Naatak Akademi Festival of Drama (2012, New Delhi)
- Participated in the 2011 Mahabharatha Festival, Indira Gandhi National Centre for the Arts, New Delhi
- Indira Gandhi National Centre for the Arts, New Delhi and the National School of Drama jointly presented as International Theatre Festival for a fortnight in 2010
- Participated in the National Theatre Festival jointly presented by the National School of Drama, New Delhi and the Government of Assam at Tejpur and Gawhati
- Participated in the National Theatre Festival presented by the National School of Drama, New Delhi for 15 days
- Three dramas each day for three days at Evam Entertainment, Chennai
- Three dramas each day for three days at Ranga Shankara, Bangalore
- Participated in Nandikar 15th National Drama Festival (1998, Kolkatta)

== Plays enacted ==
- Sri Krishna Leelalu: The Exploits of Little Krishna
- Jai Pathala Bhairavi: The Story of Folk Legend Thota Ramudu
- Lavakusa: The Exploits of Twin Prince Lava and Kusa, Sons of Srirama
- Bhakta Prahlada: The Tale of Prahlada, the Devoted Child
- Maya Bazar: The Tale of Demon King Ghatothkacha
- Braham Gari Charitra
- Bala Nagamma: The Story of a Wicked Sorcerer
- Chandi Priya
