= Sarveshwar Dayal Saxena =

Hindi writer, poet, and columnist (1927–1983)

Sarveshwar Dayal Saxena (15 September 1927 – 23 September 1983) was a Hindi writer, poet, columnist and playwright. He was one of the seven poets who first published in one of the "Tar Saptaks", which ushered in the 'Prayogvaad' (Experimentalism) era, which in time evolved to become the "Nayi Kavita" (New Poetry) movement.

Basti a city, in Uttar Pradesh he received his education at Banaras Hindu University, and Allahabad University.[2] Today he is considered a very important political poet.[3] He won the Sahitya Akademi Award for his Poetry collection, Khutiyon Par Tange Log ("People Hanging From Pegs").[citation needed] His short story, Bakri ("Scapegoat"), has been adapted as 'kuri.com', in Kannada, by M.S.Sathyu, has been staged many times over the year, with revised adaptations, starting from the Emergency period (1975–77), when it was used as a political lampoon,[4] it has also been presented as a folk play.[5] His other noted plays are, Lakh Ki Naak,[6] Hawalat[7] and Bhaun Bhaun Khaun Khaun.[8]

Sarveshwar Dayal Saxena even wrote Mukti ki Aakanksha that showed the need of independency during his time. One of his poems has been turned into an animation short, by Siddhartha Pratap Singh, titled Apni Bitiya Ke Liye Ek Kavita. he also wrote 'Sham Ek Kishan'. He also wrote many children's poem of which Ibn batuta ka juta is the popular one. He edited the children's magazine Parag.

== Bibliography ==
- People Hanging From Pegs by Sarveshwar Dayal Saxena, Tr. Kedar Nath Komal, 1991, Sahitya Akademi, ISBN 81-7201-850-9.

== Online works ==
- Sarveshwar Dayal Saxena at Kavita Kosh (in Hindi)
- Four Poems by Sarveshwar Dayal Saxena
- Suraj Ko Nahi Doobne Doonga, A Poem by Sarveshwar Dayal Saxena
