= List of University of Lucknow people =

Lucknow University people

This is a list of notable alumni from the University of Lucknow, featuring members of the University of Lucknow segregated in accordance with their fields of achievement. The individual must have either studied at the university (although they may not necessarily have taken a degree), or worked at the university in an academic capacity. Honorary fellows or those awarded an honorary degree are not included.

The list has been divided into categories indicating the field of activity in which people have become well known. Many of the university's alumni/ae have attained a level of distinction in more than one field. These individuals may appear under two categories. In general, however, an attempt has been made to put individuals in the category with which they are most associated.

== Science, engineering and technology ==
=== Engineering ===
- Siddheshwari Prasad Chakravarti (B.Sc., 1924; M.Sc., 1926) – known as the "Father of electronics and telecommunications engineering education in India"; founding Principal of Jabalpur Engineering College and founder of India's first Department of Electronics and Telecommunications Engineering

=== Space science ===
- Ritu Karidhal (B.Sc. Physics, 1994; M.Sc. Physics, 1996) – Aerospace scientist at the Indian Space Research Organisation (ISRO), known as the "Rocket Woman of India"; Deputy Operations Director of Mars Orbiter Mission (Mangalyaan), Mission Director of Chandrayaan-2, and a senior contributor to Chandrayaan-3
- Anil Bhardwaj (B.Sc., 1985; M.Sc. Physics, 1987) – Indian Astrophysicist and Director of Physical Research Laboratory; Principal Investigator of experiments Chandrayaan-1, Mars Orbiter Mission and Chandrayaan-2; experiments; recipient of the Shanti Swarup Bhatnagar Prize (2007) and Infosys Prize (2016)
- Nilamber Pant (B.Sc., 1948; M.Sc. Physics, 1952) – Indian Space scientist, former Vice Chairman of the Indian Space Research Organisation, member of the Space Commission of India, and recipient of the Padma Shri (1984)
- Hashima Hasan (B.Sc., 1968) – NASA astrophysicist; Program Scientist for NuSTAR and IXPE; former Program Scientist for the James Webb Space Telescope and Hubble Space Telescope
- S. Ichtiaque Rasool – Indian-American climatologist; Chief Scientist for Global Change at NASA; senior research scientist at NASA's Jet Propulsion Laboratory; co-founder of the International Geosphere-Biosphere Programme

=== Biological sciences and biotechnology ===
- Aindrila Mukhopadhyay (B.Sc., 1993) – Microbiologist and bioengineer; Division Deputy at Lawrence Berkeley National Laboratory and Fellow of the American Association for the Advancement of Science
- Inder Mohan Verma (M.Sc., 1966) – Molecular biologist and gene therapy researcher; former professor at the Salk Institute; member of the National Academy of Sciences
- Kailas Nath Kaul (M.Sc.Botany, 1928) – Indian botanist; founder and first director of the National Botanical Gardens (now the National Botanical Research Institute), Lucknow; recipient of Padma Bhushan (1977)
- Dharani Dhar Awasthi (B.Sc. 1943, M.Sc. 1945, Ph.D. 1947) – Indian lichenologist; regarded as the "Father of Indian Lichenology"
- Vinod Bhakuni (M.Sc., 1984; Ph.D., 1990) Molecular biophysicist; Head of the Molecular and Structural Biology Division at the Central Drug Research Institute; known for contributions to protein folding; recipient of the Shanti Swarup Bhatnagar Prize for Science and Technology
- Girjesh Govil (B.Sc., 1956) – Molecular biophysicist known for research on semi-empirical quantum chemical theories; Raja Ramanna Professor at the Tata Institute of Fundamental Research; recipient of the Shanti Swarup Bhatnagar Prize (1978).
- Navin Khanna (M.Sc., 1977) – Biotechnology scientist and developer of diagnostic technologies for viral diseases; recipient of the Padma Shri (2020) and Shanti Swarup Bhatnagar Prize
- Shyam Swarup Agarwal (B.Sc., 1958) – Geneticist, immunologist, former Director of the Sanjay Gandhi Postgraduate Institute of Medical Sciences, pioneer of medical genetics and clinical immunology education in India, and recipient of the Shanti Swarup Bhatnagar Prize
- Pramod Tandon (B.Sc., 1969; M.Sc., Botany, 1971) – Plant biotechnologist; former Vice-Chancellor of North-Eastern Hill University; former Project Director for the establishment of Indian Institute of Management, Shillong; and former CEO of Biotech Park; recipient of the Padma Shri (2009)

=== Chemistry ===
- Atul Kumar (M.Sc., 1984; Ph.D. Medicinal Chemistry, 1989) – Medicinal chemist; Professor at AcSIR and former Dean of NIPER-Raebareli

== Medicine and health sciences ==
=== Physicians and surgeons ===
This list includes alumni of King George's Medical College who graduated during the period when the college was affiliated with or constituted under Lucknow University. King George's Medical University became an independent university in 2002

- Sanduk Ruit (MBBS, 1976) – Nepali ophthalmologist and founder of the Tilganga Institute of Ophthalmology; internationally recognized for restoring sight through affordable cataract surgery; recipient of the Ramon Magsaysay Award (2006), Padma Shri (2018) and Prince Mahidol Award
- Rajendra Prasad (MBBS 1974; M.D. 1979) – Indian Pulmonologist, former Director of the Vallabhbhai Patel Chest Institute, and recipient of the Dr. B. C. Roy Award (2010)
- Ravi Kant (MBBS, 1977) – Indian Surgeon, former Director of the All India Institute of Medical Sciences, Rishikesh, former Vice-Chancellor of King George's Medical University, and recipient of the Padma Shri (2016)
- Khalid Hameed (MBBS, 1967) – British physician and healthcare administrator; member of the House of Lords, former Chief Executive Officer of Cromwell Hospital, and recipient of the Padma Shri (1992) and Padma Bhushan (2009)
- Naresh Trehan (MBBS, 1969) – Indian Cardiovascular and cardiothoracic surgeon; founder of Medanta and former founder-director of Escorts Heart Institute and Research Centre; recipient of the Padma Shri (1991) and Padma Bhushan (2001)

=== Medical researchers ===
This category includes biomedical scientists, clinical researchers, and medical academics.

- Harish Poptani (B.Sc., 1987; M.Sc. Chemistry, 1989) – Professor and Chair of the Centre for Preclinical Imaging, University of Liverpool
- Raj Kumar (Ph.D. Neuro Ayurveda, 2013) – Neurosurgeon; Director and CEO of the Rajendra Institute of Medical Sciences; founding Director of the All India Institute of Medical Sciences Rishikesh; former Vice-Chancellor of the Uttar Pradesh University of Medical Sciences

== Academia and education ==
=== College and university leadership ===
- Mahendra Pal Singh (LL.M., LL.D.) – chancellor of Central University of Haryana, Director of Indian Law Institute, vice-chancellor of West Bengal National University of Juridical Sciences (2006-2011)
- Ratan Shankar Mishra (BSc., 1942; MSc., 1943 dropped-out) – Indian mathematician, vice-chancellor of Lucknow University (1982–1985); Fellow of INSA, IAS, and NASI, and recipient of the Padma Shri (1971)
- Suraj Prasad Singh – Founder-Director General of Amity Law School, Noida; vice-chancellor of Lucknow University (1995-1997)

=== Humanities and social sciences ===
- Choudhri Mohammed Naim (B.A., 1954; M.A. in Urdu, 1955) – Professor Emeritus of South Asian Languages and Civilizations at the University of Chicago; scholar of Urdu language and literature
- Roshan Taqui (Ph.D.) – Historian and author specializing in Lucknow and Awadh studies

== Literature, journalism and media ==
=== Authors and poets ===
- Ali Jawad Zaidi (B.A., 1939; LL.B.) – Indian Urdu poet, literary scholar, author, lawyer, and Indian independence activist; author of more than 80 books, including A History of Urdu Literature, Do Adbi School, and Islami Taraqqi Pasandi; recipient of the Padma Shri (1988), Ghalib Award, and Mir Anis Award
- Ahmed Ali (B.A., 1930; M.A. English, 1931) – Novelist, poet, scholar, diplomat, and pioneer of modern Urdu short fiction; author of Twilight in Delhi, co-founder of the All-India Progressive Writers' Association, Pakistan's first ambassador to China, and recipient of Pakistan's Sitara-i-Imtiaz (1980)
- Iftikhar Arif (B.A., M.A. Sociology, 1965) – Pakistani Urdu poet, scholar, and literary administrator; former Chairman of the Pakistan Academy of Letters and former Director of the National Language Authority; recipient of Pakistan's highest literary honors, including the Nishan-e-Imtiaz(2023), Hilal-e-Imtiaz (2005), Sitara-e-Imtiaz (1999), and Pride of Performance (1990)
- Kavi Pradeep (B.A., 1939) – Indian poet, lyricist, and patriot known as Rashtrakavi (National Poet), a title conferred by the Government of India; best known for writing the patriotic anthem Aye Mere Watan Ke Logon and over 1,700 songs. Recipient of the Dadasaheb Phalke Award (1997) and the Sangeet Natak Akademi Award (1961)
- Qurratulain Hyder (B.A., M.A. English Literature, 1947) – Indian Urdu novelist, short-story writer, journalist, and academic, widely regarded as the "Grande Dame" of Urdu literature; author of Aag Ka Darya (River of Fire) and recipient of the Jnanpith Award(1989), Sahitya Akademi Award (1967), Padma Shri (1984) and Padma Bhushan (2005)
- Attia Hosain (B.A., 1933) – Indian-born British novelist, journalist, broadcaster, and short-story writer; author of the acclaimed novel Sunlight on a Broken Column and a pioneering voice in postcolonial and Partition literature
- Ismat Chughtai (B.A., 1939) – Urdu novelist, short-story writer, filmmaker, and pioneer of modern Urdu literature; recipient of the Padma Shri (1976) and co-winner of the National Film Award and Filmfare Award for Best Story for Garam Hawa

=== Journalists ===
- Seema Mustafa (B.A. Political Science) – Journalist; founder and Editor-in-Chief of The Citizen and President of the Editors Guild of India (2020–present)
- Manoj Joshi – Journalist, author, and national security analyst; Distinguished Fellow at the Observer Research Foundation
- Vinod Mehta (B.A.) – Journalist, political commentator, and founding Editor-in-Chief of Outlook
- Fatima Zakaria (B.A.) – Journalist, former Sunday Editor of The Times of India, educationist, and recipient of the Padma Shri (2006)

== Arts and entertainment ==
=== Fashion and beauty ===
- Vartika Singh (B.Sc. Clinical Nutrition and Dietetics; M.P.H.) – Model and beauty pageant titleholder; Femina Miss India Grand International 2015, Miss Universe India 2019, and India's representative at the 68th Miss Universe 2019 pageant

=== Film and television ===
- Manohar Shyam Joshi (B.Sc., 1952) – Hindi novelist, journalist and screenwriter, widely regarded as the father of Indian television soap operas; wrote Hum Log and Buniyaad and received the Sahitya Akademi Award.
- Bina Rai (B.A., 1950, dropped-out) – Actress; recipient of the Filmfare Award for Best Actress for Ghunghat (1960).
- Nivedita Bhattacharya (B.A.) – Film, television and web-series actress known for Saat Phere, Koi Laut Ke Aaya Hai, Bambai Meri Jaan, and The Vaccine War.

=== Music ===
- Anup Jalota (B.A., 1974) – Bhajan and ghazal singer, popularly known as the "Bhajan Samrat"; recipient of the Padma Shri (2012)
- Amitabh Bhattacharya (B.A. English Literature, 1999) – Lyricist and playback singer; National Film Award recipient
- Amit Mishra (B.Com.) – Indian playback singer known for his work in Hindi cinema; National Film Award recipient

=== Animation ===
- Bhimsain (Diploma in Fine Arts and Classical Music) – Film director, animator, widely regarded as the "Father of Indian animation"; recipient of 16 National Film Awards

=== Visual arts ===
- Sukumar Bose – Painter and sculptor of the Bengal School tradition; pioneer member of the All India Fine Arts and Crafts Society (AIFACS); creator of works housed in Rashtrapati Bhavan and Vatican City; recipient of the Padma Shri (1970)

=== Theatre and performing arts ===
- Raj Bisaria (M.A. English Literature, 1956) – Theatre director, actor, and educator known as the "father of modern theatre in North India"; founder of Theatre Arts Workshop and Bhartendu Academy of Dramatic Arts; recipient of the Padma Shri (1990)
- Malini Awasthi (B.A., 1987; M.A., Modern History) – Renowned Indian folk singer, widely known as the "Folk Queen of India"; trained Hindustani classical vocalist and disciple of Girija Devi; recipient of the Padma Shri (2016)
- Anil Rastogi (B.Sc., M.Sc., Biochemistry; Ph.D., Microbiology) – Indian theatre, television and film actor; former Head of Biochemistry and Director-Grade Scientist at the Central Drug Research Institute (CDRI); recipient of the Padma Shri (2026)

== Business and economics ==
=== Banking and finance ===
- Agha Hasan Abedi (M.A. English Literature; LL.B.) – Banker, philanthropist, and founder of United Bank Limited and Bank of Credit and Commerce International (BCCI); posthumously awarded the Hilal-i-Imtiaz, Pakistan's second-highest civilian honour, in 2015

=== Economist ===
- Rajiv Kumar (Ph.D., 1978) – Indian economist; 2nd Vice Chairman of NITI Aayog and former Chancellor of Gokhale Institute of Politics and Economics. He has also served as Economic Advisor in the Ministry of Finance and as Secretary General of FICCI. Recipient of Japan's Order of the Rising Sun, Gold and Silver Star (2023)
- Ashwani Mahajan (Ph.D., 1994) – Indian economist, professor and author

== Government and politics ==
=== Heads of state ===
- Zakir Husain (B.A., 1918) – President of India 1967-1969
- Shankar Dayal Sharma (LL.M., Ph.D.) – President of India 1992-1997

=== Heads of government ===
- Kirti Nidhi Bista ( M.A. 1951) – Prime Minister of Nepal 1969–1970, 1971–1973, 1977-1979
- Chandra Bhanu Gupta ( M.A., LL.B.) – Chief Minister of Uttar Pradesh 1963-1970
- Sripati Mishra (LL.B.) – Chief Minister of Uttar Pradesh 1982-1984
- Hiteswar Saikia (M.A. History, 1959) – Chief Minister of Assam 1983-1985, 1991-1996
- Satyendra Narayan Sinha (LL.B., 1940) – Indian freedom fighter and Chief Minister of Bihar 1989
- Rajkumar Jaichandra Singh (M.A. History) – Chief Minister of Manipur 1988-1990
- Barkatullah Khan (LL.B.,1946) – first Muslim Chief Minister of Rajasthan 1971-1973
- Harish Rawat (B.A., LL.B., 1979) – Chief Minister of Uttarakhand 2014-2017
- Manik Saha (MDS 1995) – Chief Minister of Tripura 2022-Incumbent
- Pushkar Singh Dhami (B.A., 1996; D.P.A., 1997; M.A., 1999; LL.B., 2002) – Chief Minister of Uttarakhand 2021-Incumbent
- Ramakrishna Hegde (M.A. History, LL.B.) – Chief Minister of Karnataka (1983–1988), Deputy Chairman of the Planning Commission (1989–1990), Minister of Commerce (1998–1999), and Member of Parliament, Rajya Sabha

=== Cabinet ministers ===
- K. C. Pant (M.Sc.) – Union Minister of Defence 1987-89, Union Minister of Education 1984-85
- Kirti Vardhan Singh (M.Sc., 1988) – Union Minister of State for External Affairs & Union Minister of State for Environment, Forest and Climate Change 2024-Incumbent
- Ramesh Lekhak (LL.B., 1988) – Minister of Home Affairs of Nepal (2024–2025); former Minister of Physical Infrastructure and Transport of Nepal 2016-17
- N. K. P. Salve (LL.B.,) – Union Minister of Power (1993–1996); President of the Board of Control for Cricket in India (1982–1985), Member of Parliament, Lok Sabha

=== Governors and lieutenant governors ===
- Arif Mohammad Khan (LL.B., 1977) – Member of Parliament, Lok Sabha, Union Minister of Civil Aviation 1989-90; Governor of Kerala 2019-25 and Governor of Bihar 2025-26
- Lalji Tandon – Member of Parliament, Lok Sabha, Governor of Bihar 2018-19; Governor of Madhya Pradesh 2019-20
- Surjit Singh Barnala (LL.B., 1945) – 11th Chief Minister of Punjab; former Governor of Uttarakhand,Tamil Nadu and Andhra Pradesh; former Member of Parliament, Lok Sabha; former Minister of Chemicals and Fertilizers
- Syed Sibtey Razi (B.Com.) – Member of Parliament, Rajya Sabha, Governor of Jharkhand 2004-09 and Governor of Assam 2009

=== Members of parliament / national legislatures ===
- Abdul Ghafoor Ahmed (M.Com, 1948) – Member of the National Assembly of Pakistan; member of the drafting committee of the 1973 Constitution of Pakistan
- Awadhesh Prasad (LL.B 1968) – Member of Parliament, Lok Sabha, Cabinet minister under Government of Uttar Pradesh
- Aditya Yadav (B.B.A., 2012; MTTM, 2014) – Member of Parliament, Lok Sabha
- Arun Nehru – Member of Parliament, Lok Sabha
- P. L. Punia (PhD Ancient Indian History 2003) – Member of the Rajya Sabha, Chairman of the National Commission for Scheduled Castes 2010-2017
- Chandrapal Singh Yadav (LL.B., 1983) – Former Member of Parliament, Lok Sabha and Rajya Sabha
- Chaudhary Dilip Singh Chaturvedi (M.A. Political Science, 1953; LL.B., 1955) – Former Member of Parliament, Lok Sabha
- Zafar Ali Naqvi (B.A., 1968; LL.B., 1974) – Member of Parliament, Lok Sabha
- Hari Om Pandey – Member of Parliament, Lok Sabha
- Dhananjay Singh (B.A., 1995) – Member of Parliament, Lok Sabha
- Dimple Yadav (B.Com, 1998) – Member of Parliament, Lok Sabha

=== State and provincial government ===
==== Deputy chief ministers ====
- Brajesh Pathak (B.Com., 1982; LL.B., 1987) – 5th Deputy Chief Minister of Uttar Pradesh; former Member of Parliament, Lok Sabha
- Dinesh Sharma (B.Com.; M.Com., 1985; D.P.A., 1986; Ph.D., 1992) – Member of Parliament, Rajya Sabha, Deputy Chief Minister of Uttar Pradesh 2017-2022; Mayor of Lucknow 2006-17
- Devi Das Thakur (LL.B., 1954) – Indian constitutional jurist and politician; served as Finance and Planning Minister of Jammu and Kashmir 1975-1982; Deputy Chief Minister of Jammu and Kashmir 1984-1986; Governor of Assam 1990-1991

==== State ministers ====
- Ashutosh Tandon (BA 1980) – Member of Uttar Pradesh Legislative Assembly, Cabinet minister under Government of Uttar Pradesh
- Suresh Kumar Khanna (LL.B., 1977)– Member of Uttar Pradesh Legislative Assembly, Cabinet Minister for Finance, Parliamentary affairs Departments under Government of Uttar Pradesh
- Daya Shankar Singh (M.A. in Med. History., 1998) – Minister of State (Independent Charge) under Government of Uttar Pradesh
- Danish Azad Ansari (B.com., MPA; Masters in Quality Management) – Minister of State for Minority Welfare
- Gopal Rai (M.A. in Sociology., 1998) – Cabinet Minister, under Government of Delhi
- Raghuraj Pratap Singh (B.A., 1989) – Member of Uttar Pradesh Legislative Assembly, Cabinet minister under Government of Uttar Pradesh, founded & national president of Jansatta Dal Loktantrik.

==== State legislators ====
- Shivpal Singh Yadav(B. P.Ed., 1977) – Member of the Uttar Pradesh Legislative Assembly, Leader of the Opposition, Uttar Pradesh Legislative Assembly 2009-12
- Raja Bhaiya
- Ram Govind Chaudhary (LL.B., 1982) Member of the Uttar Pradesh Legislative Assembly, Leader of the Opposition, Uttar Pradesh Legislative Assembly 2017-22
- Rajpal Kashyap (B.A. 1994) – Member of the Uttar Pradesh Legislative Council
- Kunwar Manvendra Singh (M.A., LL.B., 1977) – Member of Uttar Pradesh Legislative Council, Chairperson of the Uttar Pradesh Legislative Council
- Abhay Singh – Member of the Uttar Pradesh Legislative Assembly
- Denzil J. Godin – Anglo-Indian Member of the Uttar Pradesh Legislative Assembly
- Brijesh Mishra Saurabh (M.S.W., M.A. Economics, LL.B.) – Member of Uttar Pradesh Legislative Assembly
- Choudhary Ram Kishan Bairagi – Member of the Haryana Legislative Assembly

=== Political activists and party leaders ===
- Atul Kumar Anjan (LL.B., 1985) – National Secretary of the Communist Party of India
- Prashant Kishor (B.B.A., 1999) – Indian politician and political strategist; founder of the Jan Suraaj Party and Member of the Bihar Legislative Assembly
- Sajjad Zaheer (B.A., 1926) – Writer, political activist, co-founder of the Progressive Writers' Association, and founding member of the Communist Party of Pakistan
- Vijaya Raje Scindia (B.A.) – Rajmata of Gwalior, former Member of Parliament, Lok Sabha and Rajya Sabha, former Vice President of the Bharatiya Janata Party
- Vishwambhar Dayalu Tripathi (M.A. History, 1926; LL.B., 1926, Gold Medalist) – Indian freedom fighter, lawyer, and Member of Parliament

== Civil service and diplomacy ==
- Brajendranath De (B.A. 1869) – One of the earliest Indian members of the Indian Civil Service (ICS); scholar and orientalist.
- Rameshwar Nath Kao (B.A., 1936) – Founder and first Secretary (Research) of the Research and Analysis Wing (R&AW); founder of the Aviation Research Centre (ARC) and the Joint Intelligence Committee.
- Laxmi Singh (B.Tech. Mechanical Engineering; M.A. Sociology) – Indian Police Service officer; first woman Police Commissioner of Uttar Pradesh (2022–present); Inspector General of Uttar Pradesh Police
- Isha Basant Joshi (M.A.) – One of the first women officers of the Indian Administrative Service; poet and author writing under the pen name Esha Joshi.
- Durga Prasad Dhar (LL.B., 1940) – Indian politician and diplomat; served as Ambassador of India to the Soviet Union 1969–1971, 1975;A close associate of Indira Gandhi, he was a principal architect of India's intervention in the Bangladesh Liberation War and recipient of the Liberation War Friendship Honour (2012, posthumous).

== Law ==
=== Chief justices ===
- Ratna Bahadur Bista (LL.B.) – 5th Chief Justice of Nepal 1970-1976; recipient of the Order of Tri Shakti Patta (1980) and Order of Gorkha Dakshina Bahu
- Adarsh Sein Anand (LL.B., 1960) – Chief Justice of India 1998–2001; Chairperson of the National Human Rights Commission of India 2003–06; Chief Justice of the Madras High Court 1989–91; Chief Justice of Jammu and Kashmir High Court 1985-89
- Mohammad Haleem (BSc, LL.B., 1946) – Chief Justice of Pakistan 1981–1989, longest-serving Chief Justice of Pakistan; Justice of the Supreme Court of Pakistan 1977-1981; recipient of the Hilal-i-Imtiaz (1996)

=== Supreme court judges ===
- Prafulla Chandra Pant (LL.B.) – Judge of the Supreme Court of India 2014–17; Member of the National Human Rights Commission of India 2019–21; Chief Justice of the Meghalaya High Court 2013–14
- Saiyed Saghir Ahmad (LL.B.,) – Judge of the Supreme Court of India 1995–2000; Chief Justice of the Andhra Pradesh High Court 1994–1995; Chief Justice of Jammu and Kashmir High Court 1994; Judge of the Allahabad High Court 1981–1993
- Vikram Nath (LL.B., 1986) – Judge of the Supreme Court of India; former Chief Justice of the Gujarat High Court 2019-21
- Brijesh Kumar (LL.B.) – Judge of the Supreme Court of India 2000–2004; former Chief Justice of the Gujarat High Court

=== High court judges ===
- Ritu Raj Awasthi (LL.B., 1986) – Judicial Member of Lokpal 2024-Incumbent; Chairman of 22nd Law Commission of India 2022-2024; Chief Justice of the Karnataka High Court 2021-22; Judge of the Allahabad High Court
- Rajesh Singh Chauhan (B.Com., 1985; LL.B., 1988)– Judge of the Allahabad High Court, Lucknow Bench
- Attau Rahman Masoodi (LL.B., 1988) – Judge of the Allahabad High Court, Lucknow Bench

== Sports ==
=== Olympic athletes ===
- Kunwar Digvijay Singh (B.A.) – Olympic gold medal-winning field hockey player (1948, 1952); captain of the Indian hockey team at the 1952 Helsinki Olympics; recipient of the Padma Shri and Helms Trophy

=== Cricket ===
- Suresh Raina (B.A., 2006) – Former Indian international cricketer; member of the Indian teams that won the 2011 ICC Cricket World Cup and 2013 ICC Champions Trophy; first Indian batsman to score a century in all three formats of international cricket

== Religion and spirituality ==
=== Religious leaders ===
- Swami Chinmayananda (M.A. English; LL.B., 1943) – Spiritual leader, Vedanta teacher, founder of the Chinmaya Mission, and co-founder of the Vishva Hindu Parishad
- Mukund Behari Lal (BSc, 1926; MSc Zoology, 1928) – Seventh Sant Satguru of the Radhasoami Faith (1975–2002); zoologist; Founder Director of Dayalbagh Educational Institute; Vice-Chancellor of the University of Lucknow (1968–1971); Fellow of the Indian National Science Academy (INSA)

=== Scholars of religion ===
- Nabia Abbott (B.A. Honours, 1919) – American Islamic scholar, papyrologist, and paleographer; pioneer in the study of early Islamic manuscripts and Muslim women; first woman professor at the Oriental Institute, University of Chicago
- Abdur Rahman Kashgari (Fazil-e-Adab) – Islamic scholar, Arabic linguist, author, principal of Dhaka Alia Madrasa, and first khatib of the Baitul Mukarram National Mosque

== Others ==
- Pushpendra Pal Singh– Indian Army lieutenant general; served as Vice Chief of the Army Staff 2025-26; General Officer Commanding-in-Chief of Western Command 2026-Incumbent; recipient of the Ati Vishisht Seva Medal and Sena Medal.
- V. Mohini Giri (B.A. Political Science) – Women's rights activist; founder of the War Widows Association; Chairperson of the National Commission for Women (1995–1998); recipient of the Padma Bhushan (2007)
- Avadh Ojha (LL.B., 2000) – Indian educator, civil services mentor, and motivational speaker, known for teaching history and mentoring UPSC aspirants
- Ma Prem Usha – Tarot reader, astrologer, columnist, and author
