= List of Padma Shri award recipients (1954–1959) =

Recipients of a civilian award in India

Padma Shri
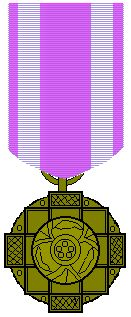
- Type: National Civilian
- Country: India
- Presented by: Government of India
- Ribbon
- Obverse: A centrally located lotus flower is embossed and the text "Padma" written in Devanagari script is placed above and the text "Shri" is placed below the lotus.
- Reverse: A platinum State Emblem of India placed in the centre with the national motto of India, "Satyameva Jayate" (Truth alone triumphs) in Devanagari Script
- Formerly called: Padma Vibhushan "Tisra Warg" (Class III)
- Established: 1954
- First award: 1954

Precedence
- Next (higher): Padma Bhushan

Padma Shri Award, India's fourth highest civilian honours - Winners, 1954–1959:

== Recipients ==
Award recipients by year
Year	Number of recipients
1954	19
1955	14
1956	9
1957	16
1958	19
1959	20

Award recipients by field
Field	Number of recipients
Arts	9
Civil Service	19
Literature & Education	11
Medicine	13
Public Affairs	9
Science & Engineering	17
Social Work	13
Sports	4
Trade & Industry	2

List of Padma Shri award recipients
Year	Recipient	Field	State
1954	Asha Devi Aryanayakam	Public Affairs	Maharashtra
1954	Bir Bhan Bhatia	Medicine	Delhi
1954	Perin Captain	Public Affairs	Maharashtra
1954	K. R. Chakravorty	Science & Engineering	West Bengal
1954	Amalprava Das	Public Affairs	Assam
1954	Mathra Das Pahwa	Medicine	Punjab
1954	Surinder Kumar Dey	Civil Service	West Bengal
1954	Vasant Ramji Khanolkar	Medicine	Maharashtra
1954	Govind Lal	Science & Engineering	Punjab
1954	Achamma Mathai	Public Affairs	Maharashtra
1954	Bhag Mehta	Civil Service	Gujarat
1954	Akhil Chandra Mitra	Science & Engineering	Uttar Pradesh
1954	Apa Saheb Bala Saheb Pant	Civil Service	Maharashtra
1954	K. Shankar Pillai	Literature & Education	Delhi
1954	Mrinmayee Ray	Public Affairs	Andhra Pradesh
1954	Khushi Ram Sharma	Science & Engineering	Punjab
1954	Tarlok Singh	Civil Service	Punjab
1954	Machani Somappa	Public Affairs	Andhra Pradesh
1954	S. P. P. Thorat	Civil Service	Maharashtra
1955	Perakath Verghese Benjamin	Medicine	Kerala
1955	Kewal Singh Choudhary	Civil Service	Punjab
1955	Zarina Currimbhoy	Social Work	Maharashtra
1955	Krishna Kanta Handique	Literature & Education	Assam
1955	Mary Clubwala Jadhav	Social Work	Tamil Nadu
1955	Digamber Vasudev Joglekar	Civil Service	Maharashtra
1955	Sidda Nath Kaul	Medicine	Delhi
1955	Manak Jehangir Bhickaji Maneckji	Civil Service	Maharashtra
1955	Mahesh Prasad Mehray	Medicine	Uttar Pradesh
1955	Humayun Mirza	Civil Service	Karnataka
1955	Habib Rahman	Science & Engineering	Delhi
1955	Laxminarayan Sahu	Literature & Education	Odisha
1955	Ratan Shastri	Literature & Education	Rajasthan
1955	Omkarnath Thakur	Arts	Gujarat
1956	Sohan Singh	Medicine	Punjab
1956	Surya Kumar Bhuyan	Literature & Education	Rajasthan
1956	Mohan Lal	Medicine	Uttar Pradesh
1956	Satish Chandra Majumdar	Science & Engineering	West Bengal
1956	Murugappa Channaveerappa Modi	Medicine	Karnataka
1956	Sukhdev Pande	Literature & Education	Uttarakhand
1956	Chintaman Govind Pandit	Medicine	Gujarat
1956	Sthanam Narasimha Rao	Arts	Andhra Pradesh
1956	Isaac Santra	Medicine	West Bengal
1957	Jaswantrai Jayantilal Anjaria	Civil Service	Maharashtra
1957	Atmaram Ramchand Chellani	Civil Service	Andhra Pradesh
1957	Laxman Mahadeo Chitale	Science & Engineering	Maharashtra
1957	Nalini Bala Devi	Literature & Education	Assam
1957	Narayan Swami Dharmarajan	Civil Service	Tamil Nadu
1957	Gurbakhsh Singh	Civil Service	Punjab
1957	Ram Prakash Gehlote	Science & Engineering	Delhi
1957	Thackkadu Natesasastrigal Jagadisan	Social Work	Tamil Nadu
1957	Sudhir Khastgir	Arts	Uttar Pradesh
1957	Ralengnao Khathing	Public Affairs	Manipur
1957	Dwaram Venkataswamy Naidu	Arts	Andhra Pradesh
1957	Krishnaswami Ramiah	Science & Engineering	Andhra Pradesh
1957	S. R. Ranganathan	Literature & Education	Karnataka
1957	Samarendranath Sen	Civil Service	West Bengal
1957	Balbir Singh	Sports	Chandigarh
1957	Khushdeva Singh	Medicine	Punjab
1958	Debaki Bose	Arts	West Bengal
1958	Punamalai Ekambaranathan	Social Work	Tamil Nadu
1958	Fathema Ismail	Social Work	Maharashtra
1958	Shambhu Maharaj	Arts	Uttar Pradesh
1958	Nargis	Arts	Maharashtra
1958	Bal Raj Nijhawan	Science & Engineering	– (Note: Bal Raj Nijhawan was citizen of Australia.)
1958	Benjamin Peary Pal	Science & Engineering	Delhi
1958	Navalpakkam Parthasarthy	Science & Engineering	– (Note: Navalpakkam Parthasarthy was citizen of Thailand.)
1958	Balwant Singh Puri	Social Work	Punjab
1958	Lakshminarayanapuram Ananthakrishnan Ramdas	Science & Engineering	Delhi
1958	Devika Rani	Arts	Karnataka
1958	Argula Nagaraja Rao	Trade & Industry	Andhra Pradesh
1958	Satyajit Ray	Arts	West Bengal
1958	Moturi Satyanarayana	Public Affairs	Tamil Nadu
1958	Ram Singh	Civil Service	Punjab
1958	Kunwar Digvijai Singh	Sports	Uttar Pradesh
1958	R. S. Subbalakshmi	Social Work	Tamil Nadu
1958	Ram Chandra Varma	Literature & Education	Uttar Pradesh
1958	Magan Lal Tribhuvandas Vyas	Literature & Education	Gujarat
1959	K. S. Chandrasekharan	Literature & Education	Tamil Nadu
1959	Sailabala Das	Social Work	Odisha
1959	Manohar Balvant Diwan	Social Work	Maharashtra
1959	Mary Ratnamma Issac	Social Work	Karnataka
1959	Lakshman Singh Jangpangi	Social Work	Uttarakhand
1959	Surendranath Kar	Science & Engineering	West Bengal
1959	Ganesh Gobind Karkhanis	Social Work	Karnataka
1959	Parixitalal Lallu Bhai Majumdar	Social Work	Gujarat
1959	Mathew Kandathil Mathulla	Civil Service	Karnataka
1959	Om Prakash Mathur	Science & Engineering	West Bengal
1959	Pratapri Girdhari Lal Mehta	Public Affairs	Maharashtra
1959	Onkar Srinivasa Murthy	Civil Service	Tamil Nadu
1959	Balwant Singh Nag	Civil Service	Punjab
1959	Parameswaran Kuttappa Panikkar	Civil Service	Kerala
1959	Shivaji Ganesh Patwardhan	Medicine	Maharashtra
1959	Atma Ram	Trade & Industry	West Bengal
1959	Mihir Sen	Sports	West Bengal
1959	Homi Sethna	Science & Engineering	Maharashtra
1959	Milkha Singh	Sports	Chandigarh
1959	Badri Nath Uppal	Science & Engineering	Chandigarh
