= Methodist High School, Kanpur =

Coordinates: 26.4645°N 80.3655°E

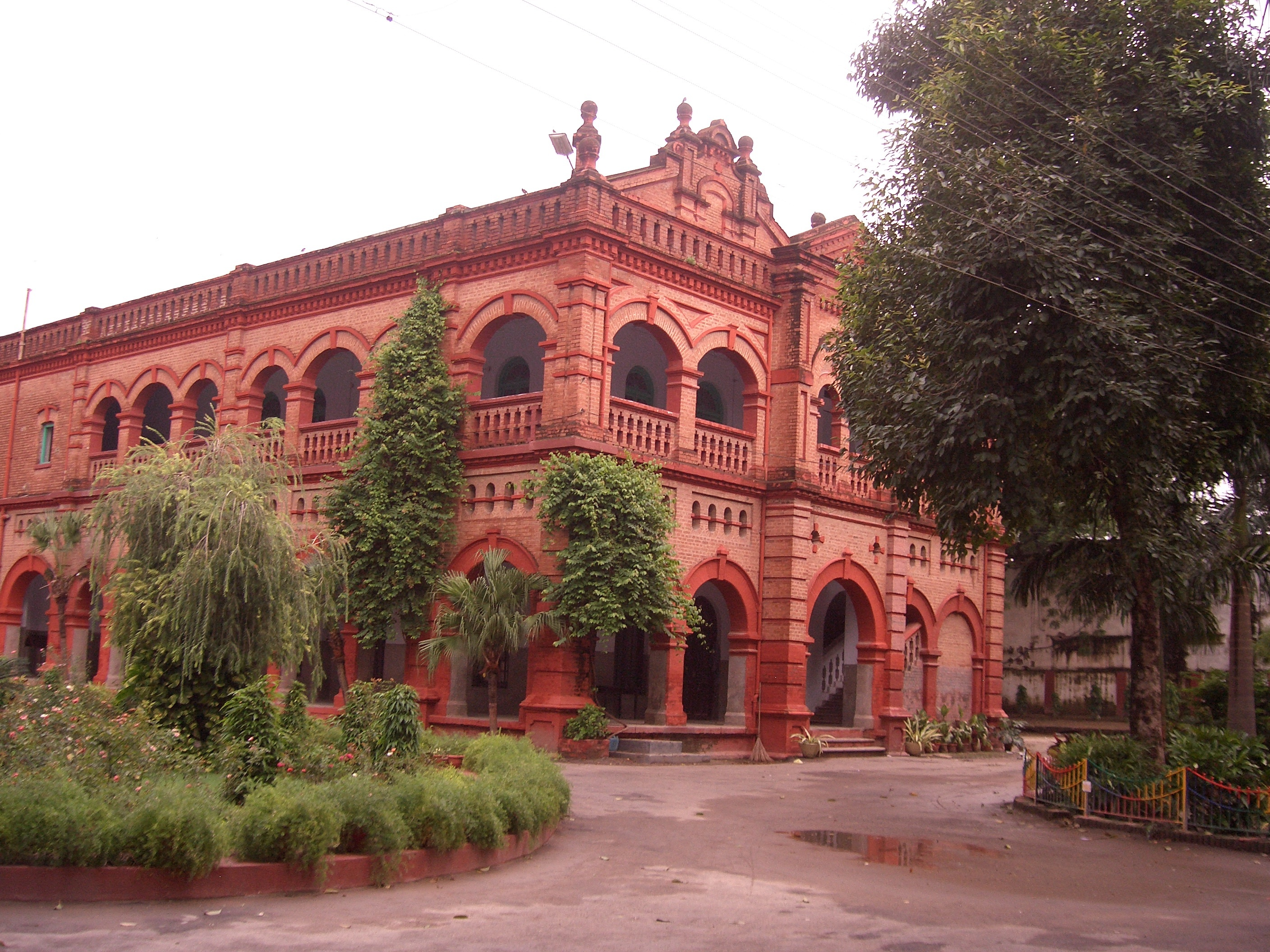
Senior Building

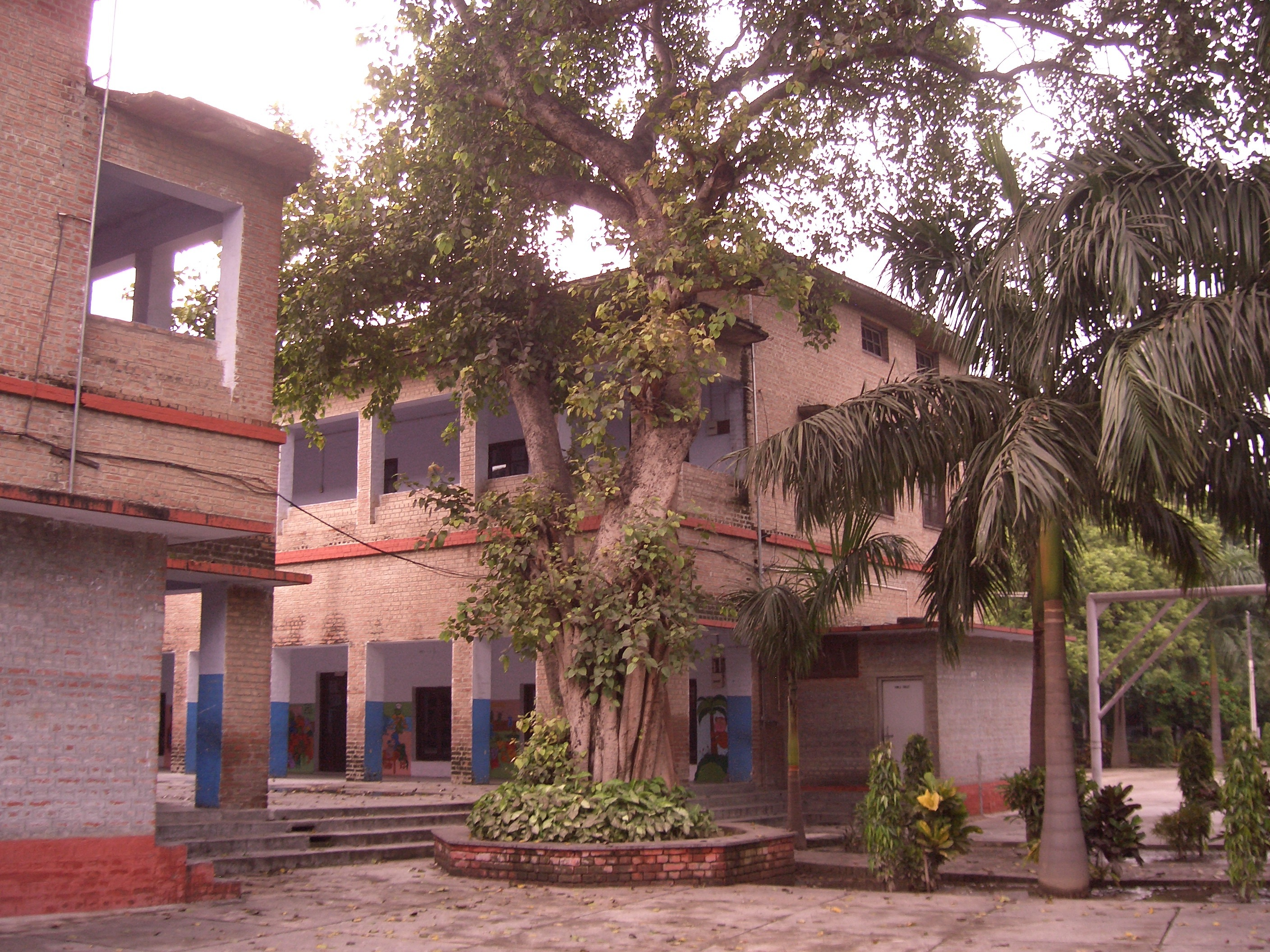
Junior Building

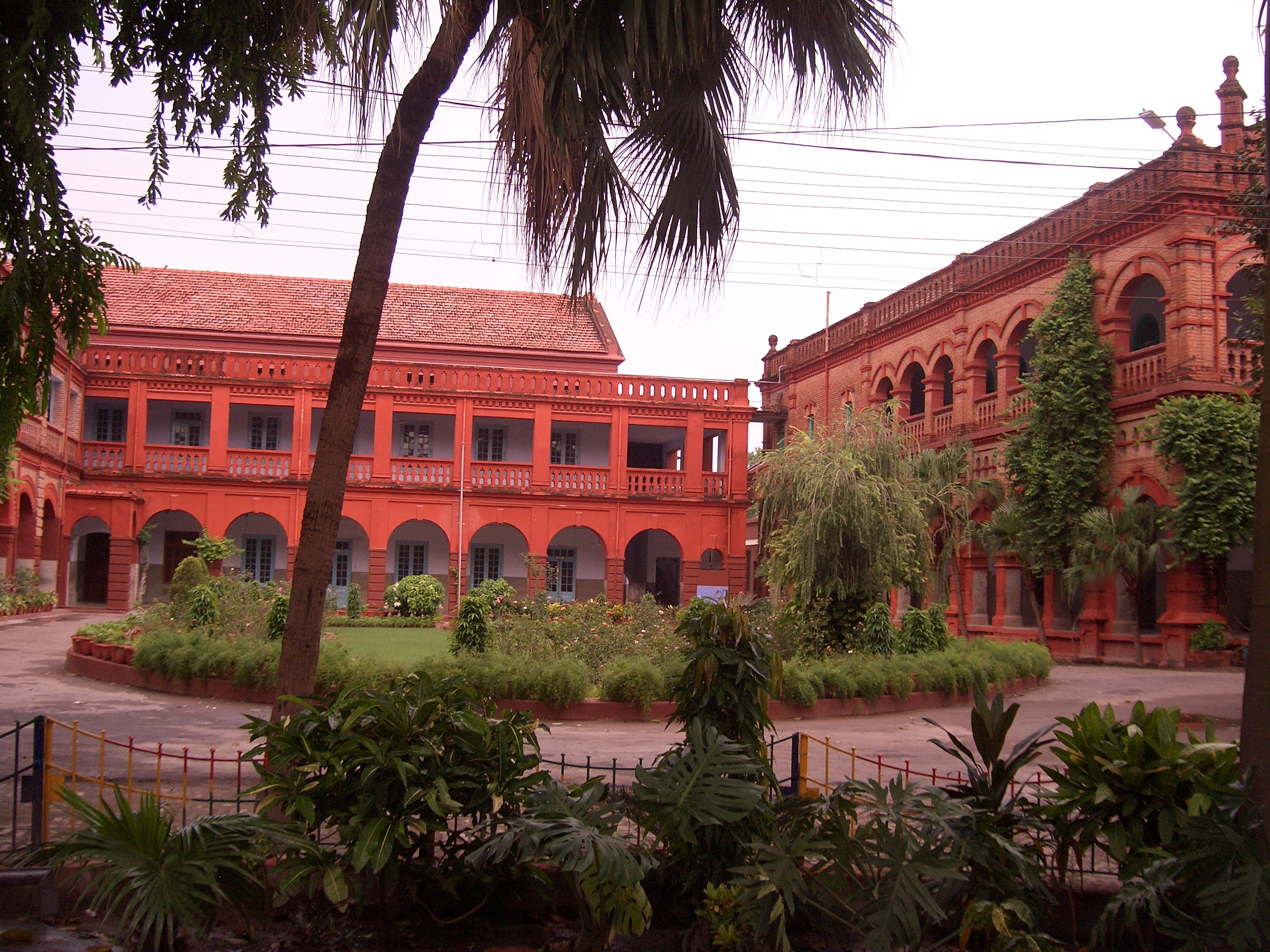
Senior Building

Methodist High School, or MHS Kanpur, was established in Kanpur, India in 1876 (originally named Girls' High School) by the American Missionary Educationist Isabella Thoburn. MHS is a sister school to the Isabella Thoburn College of Lucknow.

== History ==
Established in a large thatched bungalow on the banks of the River Ganges, the school was later relocated to its present campus at 73, Cantonment. It has a large, tree-abundant compound, with four buildings: Elementary school (primary-KG), Primary School (1-5 grades) and Senior School (6-10-11 Grades). A Methodist Church is within the precincts of the school.

The school was called the Girls' High School until the 1940s even though it did admit some boys. The name was changed from the "Girls' High School" to the "Methodist High School" in 1952 at the time of the 75th year celebrations, as the boys objected to being called "boys of the Girls' High School."

The school was started to educate "Anglo-Indian" children (children of English men and their household Indian servants, who were often neglected by all sectors of society).

== Post-independence developments ==
After independence, the school began offering nursery, primary and secondary education to children from all communities in Kanpur.

== Magazine and motto ==
- Quisqualis (Hindi: मधू मालती) is the name of the student-edited school magazine. It is named after a flowering creeper that covers the walls of the Senior School.
- The motto of the school in Latin is "Vincit Omnia Veritas", or "Truth Conquers All".

== Management ==
The school is run and managed by the Methodist Church in India, which also runs a number of schools and colleges in India such as the Isabella Thoburn College, Lucknow UP, the Lucknow Christian College, the Calcutta Boys' School and the Calcutta Girls' High School, Kolkata and the Baldwin Boys High School and Baldwin Girls High School, Bangalore, to name a few.
