= Kshitij =

Kshitij is a masculine name that means "horizon" in Sanskrit:

Kshitij may refer to:

- Kshitij (film), a 1974 Indian film starring Helen and Bharat Kapoor
- Kshitij (festival), an annual techno-management fest of Indian Institute of Technology Kharagpur
- Kshitij English Boarding School, a private boarding school, Banepa, Nepal
- Kshitij Wagh (born 1977), an Indian playback singer and a music composer
- Kshitij Thakur (fl. 2009–2012), an Indian politician

== See also ==
- Kshitiz (disambiguation)
- Kshitish, alternative form of the Indian male given name
- Shitij Kapur, principal of King's College London, England
