= Kshitish =

Kshitish is a given name. Notable people with the name include:

- Kshitish Ranjan Chakravorty (1916–1994), Indian engineer
- Kshitish Mohan Lahiri (fl. early 20th century), Bangladeshi activist
- Kshitish Chandra Neogy (1888–1970), Indian politician
