= Lilavati Singh =

Indian educator, professor of literature and philosophy

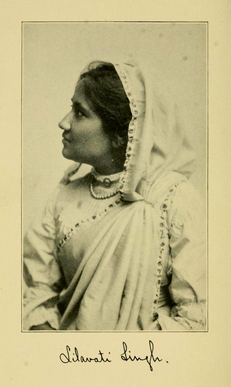
Lilavati Singh, Indian college professor, from a 1909 publication

Lilavati Singh (14 December 1868 – 9 May 1909), also seen as Lilivati Singh, was an Indian educator, professor of literature and philosophy at Isabella Thoburn College in Lucknow.

== Early life and education ==
Lilavati Singh was born in Gorakhpur, to Christian parents, with the baptismal name "Ethel Raphael." She remembered reading Louisa May Alcott's Little Women as a girl, and feeling called to helpfulness as portrayed in the novel.

She began to use her Indian name officially as a young woman. She attended Miss Thoburn's boarding school as a girl, and in 1895 earned a degree in English literature from the University of Allahabad, one of the first two women to earn a degree from that institution.

== Career ==
Isabella Thoburn opened a collegiate section of her school, and in 1892 she hired former student Lilavati Singh as a teacher, the only Indian teacher on the faculty. Singh became professor of literature and philosophy at Isabella Thoburn College. In 1902, she was appointed vice principal of the school, following the death of Isabella Thoburn.

Singh spoke and sang on a tour in the United States in 1899 and 1900, under the auspices of the Women's Foreign Missionary Society, including a stop at Carnegie Hall, where she was on a program with papers from Isabella Bird Bishop and Priscilla Bright McLaren, among others. In 1909 she made another lecture tour of the United States to raise awareness of Indian women's lives, and also intending to pursue graduate studies at Radcliffe College.

She chaired the women's committee of the World Students' Christian Federation, and represented India at that organization's conference in Tokyo in 1907. In 1908 she attended international conferences in Europe and England. Singh also edited a women's newspaper, Rafik-i-Niswan, and translated a biography of Booker T. Washington, whom she admired.

== Personal life ==
Singh died during her 1909 lecture tour of the United States, in a hospital in Chicago, from complications following an emergency operation. She was 40 years old. Her remains were buried in a churchyard in Elgin, Illinois. Her gravestone was inscribed, "The Peace of God was on her Face." A Lilavati Singh dormitory at Isabella Thoburn College was built with memorial donations, and named in her memory.
