= M. A. Chakko =

Indian politician

Mazhuvancheriparambath Avaram Chakko (1870–1941) was Superintendent of Police, Commissioner of Excise, and Legislative Council member in the princely state of Cochin (Kochi), now a part of Kerala state in India. Joining the Cochin government service during the reign of the king, Maharaja Sir Sri Rama Varma, he rose rapidly through several administrative positions and was the first Christian Superintendent of Police in Cochin State, a post he held for over ten years.

Chakko played a part in the creation of the independent and autocephalous Malankara Orthodox Syrian Church, also known as the Indian Orthodox Church.

== Family ==
One of his daughters, Sarah Chakko (1905–1954), was principal of Isabella Thoburn College, Lucknow, India, and the first woman president of the World Council of Churches.
