= Rajendra Lahiri =

Indian revolutionary (1901–1927)

Rajendra Nath Lahiri
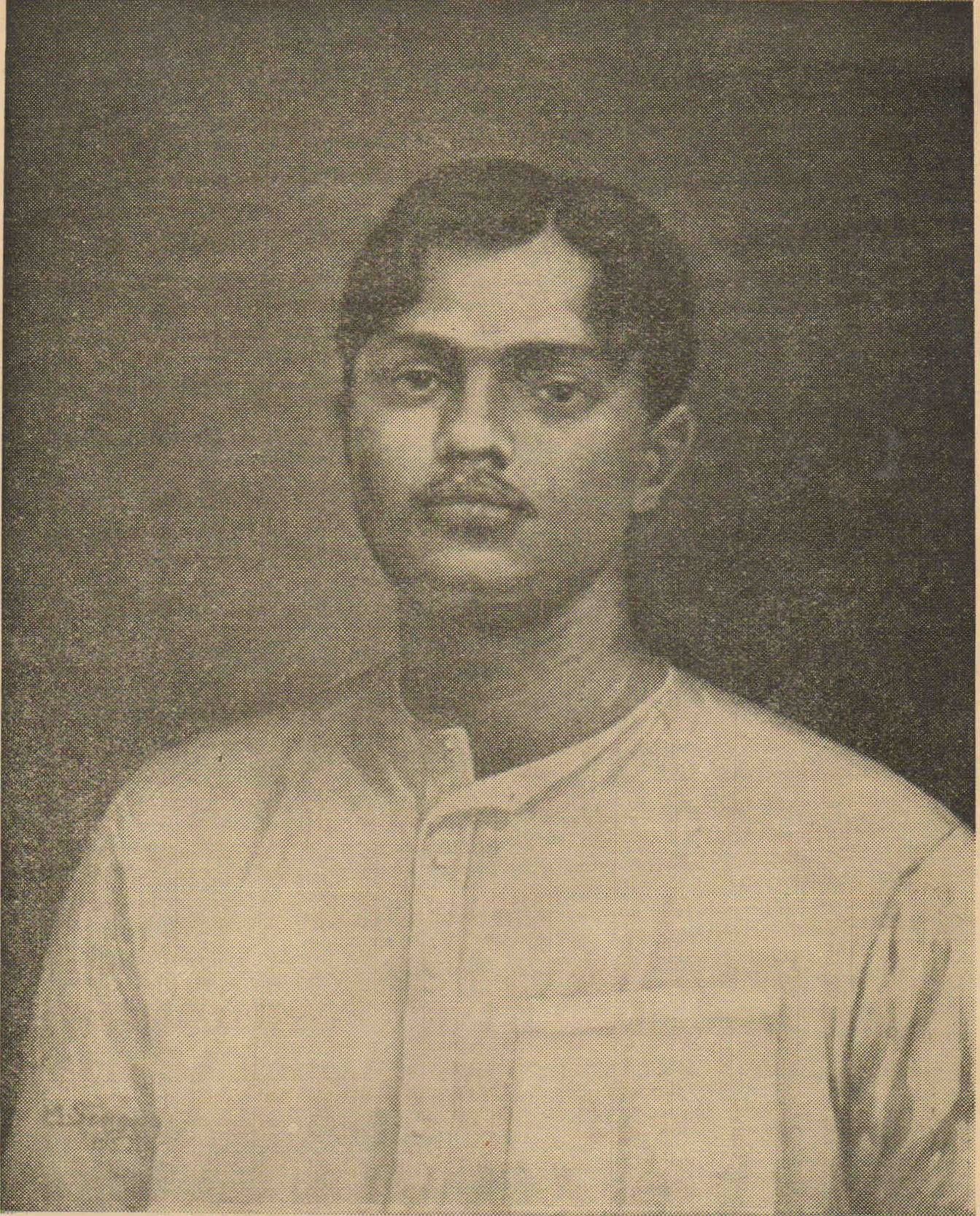
- Born: 23 June 1901; Pabna, Bengal Presidency, British India
- Died: 17 December 1927 (aged 26); Gonda, United Provinces, British India
- Cause of death: Execution by hanging
- Education: Banaras Hindu University
- Occupation: Revolutionary
- Organization: Hindustan Republican Association
- Movement: Indian independence movement
- Father: Kshitish Mohan Lahiri

Rajendra Nath Lahiri (23 June 1901 — 17 December 1927), known simply as Rajendra Lahiri, was an Indian revolutionary, who was a mastermind behind the Kakori conspiracy and Dakshineshwar bombing. He was an active member of the Hindustan Republican Association, aimed at ousting the British from India.

== Early life ==
Rajendra Lahiri was born on 23 June 1901 in the village of Lahiri Mohanpur in a Bengali Brahmin family of Pabna District, Bengal Presidency (now in Lahiri Mohanpur, ullapara, Sirajgonj, Bangladesh). His father, Kshitish Mohan Lahiri, owned a large estate there.

== Dakshineswar bomb incident ==
Lahiri took part in the Dakshineswar bombing incident and absconded. He went to Benares and started studying. He was a M.A. student in Department of History, Banaras Hindu University when the revolutionary activities started in United Provinces (now Uttar Pradesh). He joined the Hindustan Republican Association along with some of his Bengali friends.

== Kakori conspiracy ==
He was the mastermind behind the Kakori train robbery on 9 August 1925. He was arrested and tried in the previous bomb case of Dakshineswar in Bengal and sent to jail for ten years rigorous imprisonment. When the legal proceedings started in Lucknow for the train robbery, he was also included in the Kakori conspiracy case and tried with several other revolutionaries.

== Death ==
He was found guilty after a long trial and was hanged in the Gonda district jail on 17 December 1927, two days before the scheduled date, along with Thakur Roshan Singh, Ashfaq Ullah and Ram Prasad Bismil.
