= Sarah Chakko =

Teacher, historian and president of the World council of churches

- Sarah Chakko, from a 1937 publication.
- Born: 13 February 1905; Trichur
- Died: 25 January 1954 (aged 48); Lucknow
- Known for: President, Isabella Thoburn College; President, World Council of Churches
- Parent: M. A. Chakko

Sarah Chakko (13 February 1905 – 25 January 1954) was an Indian college professor and administrator, president of Isabella Thoburn College in Lucknow, and the first woman to be elected to the presidency of the World Council of Churches. She was a member of the Malankara Orthodox Syrian Church.

== Early life and education ==
Chakko was born in Trichur, the second daughter (the fourth of ten children) of police superintendent Mazhuvancheriparambath Avaram Chakko in Kerala. She held degrees from Queen Mary's College Madras, and Presidency College. She studied history and taught the subject from 1925, at Bentinck High School of the London Missionary Society in Madras. In 1937, she graduated with a master's degree in education at the University of Chicago.

== Career ==
Chakko traveled extensively to the United States, to Europe and to the Middle East. In 1936, Chakko visited the United States and gave talks at churches with her missionary colleague, Florence Salzer. 1937, she was a delegate to the World Student Christian Federation meeting in San Francisco.

In 1943, Chakko was appointed professor at the Isabella Thoburn College in Lucknow; she later become president of the school. In addition to her teaching activity, she took part in the World Student Christian Federation and became its chairman for India, Burma, and Sri Lanka. In 1947, she was a vice president of the World YWCA.

She was involved in the work of the World Council of Churches (WCC). She spoke at the first assembly of the WCC in 1948, in Amsterdam. She was elected as one of the WCC's presidents in August 1951 after the resignation of T. C. Chao. She was the first woman in the presidency of the council, and the first (and for several decades the only) ecumenical functionary in the Syriac Orthodox Church. But by her work and other engagement, she was more closely related to other denominations, especially the Presbyterians and the Methodists.

== Death ==
In January 1954, Chakko died suddenly from a heart attack, in a sporting accident at Lucknow, just before her 49th birthday. Congregations around the world marked her death with memorial services, noting that she wrote the 1954 service theme for the World Day of Prayer. She was remembered at the annual meeting of the World Council of Churches in Evanston, Illinois, later in 1954.

== Biography ==
- Kurian, M (1998). Sarah Chakko: a voice of women in ecumenical movement. Thiruvalla, India: Christhava Sahithya Samithy. OCLC 41868010.
