= Raja Ram Pandey =

Indian politician (1955–2013)

Member of Uttar Pradesh Legislative Assembly
- In office 1996–2002
- Preceded by: Umashankar
- Succeeded by: Brijesh Mishra Saurabh
- Constituency: Garwara

Personal details
- Born: 15 May 1955 Pratapgarh, Uttar Pradesh
- Died: 31 October 2013 (aged 58) Lucknow, Uttar Pradesh
- Party: Samajwadi Party
- Other political affiliations: Janata Dal; Samta Party; Samajwadi Party

Raja Ram Pandey (15 May 1955 – 31 October 2013) was an Indian politician from the Samajwadi Party. He was a three-term member of legislative assembly and had also represented Vishwanathganj constituency of Pratapgarh district, Uttar Pradesh. He was in the Cabinet of the chief minister Akhilesh Yadav.

== Career ==
Raja Ram Pandey fought election six times and three times he won election from Vishwanathganj constituency of Pratapgarh. Raja Ram Pandey began his career from the political party Janata Dal and was elected first time as member of legislative assembly in 1997. He became a cabinet minister in the Bhartiya Janta Party government in Uttar Pradesh. Later he won as a candidate of Ram Vilas Paswan s'outfit Lok Janshakti Party in the 2002 Uttar Pradesh assembly election.

He lost in the 2007 assembly election as a Samajwadi Party candidate and in 2012 Raja Ram won election from Vishwanathganj Vidhan Sabha in Pratapgarh.

He died on 31 October 2013 following a heart attack.

== Cabinet minister ==
Rajaram became a cabinet minister in Bhartiya Janta Party government in 1997 Mulayam Singh's government in 2003 and again in 2012, when Akhilesh Yadav became chief minister of Uttar Pradesh and was again in his Cabinet as minister of Khaadi and village industry. He became cabinet minister three times and all three times he was given department of Khadi and village industries.

== See also ==
- Council of Ministers of Uttar Pradesh
- Pratapgarh
- List of people from Pratapgarh
