= Shivajirao Patwardhan =

Indian physician and social reformer (1892–1986)

Dajisaheb Shivajirao Patwardhan
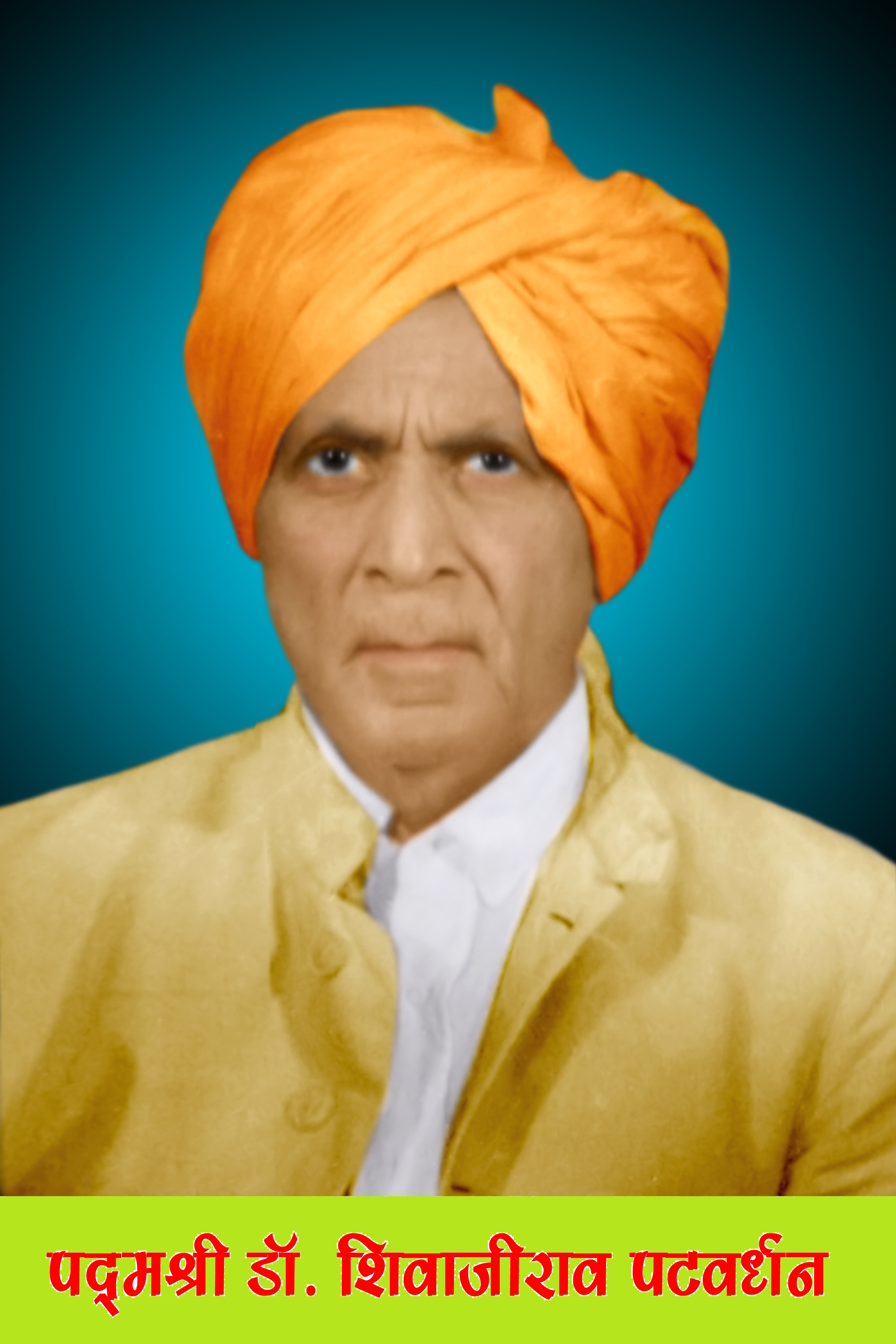
- Born: 28 December 1892; Asangi
- Died: 7 May 1986 (aged 93)
- Occupations: physician, freedom fighter, writer, social activist
- Spouse: Gangutai Marathe (who changed her name to Parvatibai),
- Awards: Padma Shri; 1959

Shivajirao Patwardhan (28 December 1892 – 7 May 1986) was an Indian physician, social reformer and activist. He was the founder of the Vidarbha Maharogi Seva Mandal (Tapovan) and is recognized for his significant contributions to the treatment and rehabilitation of leprosy patients in India, mainly in Maharashtra.

== Early life ==
Shivajirao Patwardhan was born on 28 December 1892 in Asangi, a village in present-day Karnataka. He pursued higher education in Kolkata, where he obtained a degree in homeopathic medicine in 1914. During his time in Kolkata, he was influenced by the teachings of Swami Vivekananda, which shaped his approach to social service.

Patwardhan began his medical career during the plague epidemic in Kolkata, where he provided treatment to affected individuals. He subsequently worked with the Ramakrishna Mission in Allahabad from 1915 to 1916 and served in Wardha for one year. In 1917, he relocated to Amravati and established his medical practice. In 1918, Shivajirao married Gangutai Marathe (who changed her name to Parvatibai), the daughter of Theosophist Appasaheb Marathe of Nagpur.

== Participation in the Indian independence movement ==
Patwardhan was deeply influenced by the ideologies of Indian leaders such as Lokmanya Tilak, Mahatma Gandhi, and Gopal Krishna Gokhale. He actively participated in the Indian independence movement, leading the non-cooperation movement in Amravati and organizing protests such as the Salt Satyagraha at Dahihanda. His activism resulted in several periods of imprisonment: nine months in 1930 for participating in civil disobedience activities, one and a half years in 1932 for involvement in non-cooperation efforts, and three years in 1942 for participating in the Quit India Movement.

== Leprosy rehabilitation ==
While imprisoned in Shioni Jail, Patwardhan witnessed a distressing incident involving a leprosy patient’s death and the subsequent mistreatment of the body. This event marked a turning point in his life, motivating him to dedicate himself to the welfare of leprosy patients. In 1945, after his release, Patwardhan shifted his focus from politics to social work. He established Tapovan at Amravati in 1946 in the name of Vidarbha Maharogi Seva Mandal with the support of Acharya Vinoba Bhave. By 1947, under Mahatma Gandhi's guidance, he expanded his efforts to include the rehabilitation of leprosy patients, emphasizing self-reliance after treatment.

Recognizing the need for economic independence among patients, he established various workshops, including carpentry, weaving, printing, and sewing. These initiatives provided employment opportunities tailored to the capabilities of the patients. To address social reintegration, he facilitated marriages among cured patients and rehabilitated them within society. Concerned about the children of leprosy patients, he established schools at Tapovan in 1962, including nursery, primary, and high schools.

== Academic coverage ==
The Marathi (2nd language) textbook of Maharashtra State Board of Secondary and Higher Secondary Education contains a chapter on Tapovan named as Chudiwala.

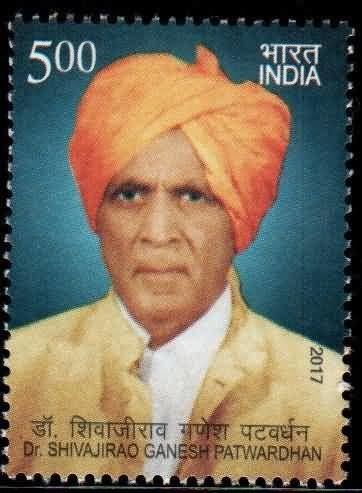
Dr. Shivajirao Ganesh Patwardhan commemorative stamp

== Awards and honours ==
In 1959, he was awarded the Padma Shri for his work in the rehabilitation of leprosy patients. On his birth anniversary, 28 December 2017, the Government of India issued a commemorative stamp in his honour.

The Government of India Post Department had released a postage stamp honouring him.

== Death ==
In 1984, Patwardhan handed over the administration of Tapovan to the Government of India. He retired to Chandur Railway, where he began Prayopaveshan (a voluntary fast unto death) on 20 April 1986. He died on 7 May 1986.
