= Ishwar C. Harris =

Ishwar Chandra Harris (Hindi: ईश्वर हैरिस, Urdu: اِیْشوَرْ ہیرس) (July 13, 1943 – July 1, 2025), was a professor of religion whose focus spanned Hinduism, Buddhism, and Islam. He was considered an expert on the culture and history of India, and is the author of several books and numerous articles on the topic of Eastern religions. His works have also dealt with Gandhian philosophy and the Sarvodaya movement.

== Early life and education ==
Ishwar Harris was born into a Methodist Christian family in Uttar Pradesh, India on July 13, 1943. In 1961 Harris received his B.A. from the Lucknow Christian College in India. This was followed by a M.Div. from the Howard University School of Divinity in 1967, S.T.M. from the Pacific School of Religion in 1969, and a Ph.D. from Claremont Graduate School in 1974.

== Career ==
Harris taught religion at Rutgers University and San Bernardino State College before coming to the College of Wooster in 1981 where he was the Synod Professor of Religious Studies there until his formal retirement in May 2009. Harris brought groups of students to study abroad in the Thai and Southeast Asian Studies Program at Payap University in Chiang Mai, Thailand three times in 2003, 2007, and 2009 (August–December).

Harris is a member of the American Academy of Religion, the Society for Asian Studies, ASIANetwork, and the Ohio Academy of Religion. Harris spent five weeks in 1999 at the Tofukuji Monastery in Kyoto with the Rinzai master and head abbot, Keido Fukushima. This was followed by a three-month trip in 2001 and a return trip in 2003. The result of those trips was the book The Laughing Buddha of Tofukuji. Harris was married to his wife, Jyotsna, and had two daughters, Anjali and Meera. He was a member of a local United Methodist church in Wooster, Ohio.

== See also ==
- Keido Fukushima
- College of Wooster
- Gandhism

== Bibliography ==
- The Laughing Buddha of Tofukuji: The Life of Zen Master Keido Fukushima (World Wisdom, 2004) ISBN 978-0-941532-62-4
- Gandhians in Contemporary India: The Vision and the Visionaries (Edwin Mellen Press, 1998) ISBN 978-0-7734-8352-1
- Radhakrishnan, the profile of a universalist (Minerva, 1982) ISBN 978-0-8364-0778-5
