= Kshitiz =

Kshitiz may refer to

- Kshitiz Educational Foundation in Nepal
- Kshitiz Sharma (born 1990), Indian cricketer

== See also ==
- Kshitij (disambiguation)
