= Brijesh Mishra Saurabh =

Indian politician

Member of Uttar Pradesh Legislative Assembly
- In office 2007–2012
- Preceded by: Raja Ram Pandey
- Succeeded by: Constituency abolished
- Constituency: Gadwara (now Sadar, Uttar Pradesh)

Personal details
- Born: 7 July 1965 (age 61) Pratapgarh district, Uttar Pradesh, India
- Party: Bharatiya Janata Party (2023–present)
- Other political affiliations: Bahujan Samaj Party (2007–2012); Bharatiya Janata Party (2012–2022); Samajwadi Party (Jan.2022-Aug.2022)
- Spouse: Seema Mishra (m. 2001)
- Children: 3 (one daughter and two sons)
- Education: University of Lucknow
- Occupation: Politician
- Profession: Agriculturist, businessperson, lawyer

Brijesh Mishra Saurabh, commonly known as Brijesh Saurabh, is an Indian politician from Pratapgarh district, Uttar Pradesh. He served as a Member of Uttar Pradesh Legislative Assembly from 2007 to 2012, representing the Gadwara constituency, which was later reorganised as the Sadar, Uttar Pradesh constituency following delimitation ahead of the 2012 Uttar Pradesh Legislative Assembly election.

== Personal life and student politics ==
Brijesh Saurabh is originally from Pratapgarh district, Uttar Pradesh and later lived in Lucknow. He is married to Seema Mishra. They were married in 2001 and have one daughter and two sons.

According to an interview published by Dainik Bhaskar, Saurabh came from an agricultural family and was one of nine siblings. His father, Hiralal Mishra, was described in the report as a freedom fighter.

He became involved in student politics while studying at the University of Lucknow and later served as general secretary of the Lucknow University Students' Union.

The Dainik Bhaskar interview also stated that he was associated with the Rashtriya Swayamsevak Sangh during his early political years and participated in student movements at Lucknow University.

A 2025 report published by Hindustan Times recalled his participation in student protests at Lucknow University during 1989. According to the report, he led demonstrations against an order directing hostel residents to vacate their rooms, after which several student leaders were detained by police.

According to his election affidavit filed during the 2007 Uttar Pradesh Legislative Assembly election, he holds postgraduate qualifications including Master of Social Work (M.S.W.), Master of Arts in Economics, and Bachelor of Laws (LL.B.).

== Political career ==
He contested the 2007 Uttar Pradesh Legislative Assembly election from the Gadwara Assembly constituency as a candidate of the Bahujan Samaj Party (BSP). He defeated senior Samajwadi Party leader and former minister Raja Ram Pandey by a margin of 19,249 votes.

His victory was regarded as a significant political upset in Pratapgarh district, Uttar Pradesh, as Raja Ram Pandey had been considered influential in the constituency.

Following the delimitation of assembly constituencies before the 2012 Uttar Pradesh Legislative Assembly election, the Gadwara Assembly constituency was abolished and reorganised into the Pratapgarh Sadar constituency.

After being denied a BSP ticket in the 2012 Assembly election, he joined the Bharatiya Janata Party (BJP) in December 2012.

In January 2022, he joined the Samajwadi Party in the presence of party president Akhilesh Yadav ahead of the 2022 Uttar Pradesh Legislative Assembly election.

He later resigned from the Samajwadi Party in 2022 following internal political disagreements.

== Political conflicts and controversies ==
During the early 2000s, media reports linked Saurabh with the formation of a group called the "Saurabh Sena" in Pratapgarh district. A report published by The Times of India in 2005 described the group as a private political outfit formed amid intense political rivalries and armed factionalism in the region.

According to his affidavit submitted to the Election Commission of India during the 2007 Uttar Pradesh Legislative Assembly election, he declared multiple criminal cases registered against him, including charges related to attempt to murder, rioting, criminal intimidation, unlawful assembly, and provisions of the Arms Act.

The affidavit also declared movable and immovable assets, educational qualifications, and pending legal proceedings as required under election disclosure rules.

During the 2009 Lok Sabha elections, Brijesh Saurabh was reportedly among several political figures placed under preventive house arrest following orders issued by the Election Commission Of India to maintain law and order during polling.

In 2010, The Indian Express reported that a Bhopal court issued a non-bailable warrant against him in connection with the 2005 killing of advocate Raghuvendra Singh in Pratapgarh district, Uttar Pradesh.

In the same year, The Indian Express reported that police authorities had been unable to execute the non-bailable warrant against him despite repeated efforts, and that he continued to appear publicly during the period.

The case later drew national attention after the Supreme Court Of India transferred the trial outside Uttar Pradesh to avoid influence. The Indian Express subsequently reported that police were unable to execute warrants issued against Saurabh in the case.

In 2013, gangster charges were filed against him and several associates following clashes linked to a protest at Antu police station in Pratapgarh district. Court records from the Allahabad High Court later referenced criminal proceedings involving him in relation to the matter.

Later in 2013, Business Standard reported that Saurabh and several supporters were arrested following clashes and allegations of obstructing government work during a political meeting in Pratapgarh district, Uttar Pradesh.

In 2022, he alleged that an attempt was made to attack him near SGPGI in Lucknow shortly after he joined the Samajwadi Party.
