= Laxman Mahadeo Chitale =

Indian architect and author (1892–1960)

- Born: 1892; Ratnagiri, Maharashtra, India
- Died: 1960 (aged 67–68)
- Occupation: Architect
- Awards: Padma Shri; RIBA Fellowship

Laxman Mahadeo Chitale (1892-1960) was an Indian architect, author and one of the first Indian associates of the Royal Institute of British Architects. He was the architect of several landmark buildings in India such as the Life Insurance Corporation of India building, Chennai, Ram Mohan Palace, Kochi which was once the seat of the High Court of Kerala, Subramania Bharati Monument, Ettayapuram, Central Leather Research Institute (CLRI), Adyar and the Reserve Bank of India building, Nagpur. The Government of India honoured him in 1957, with the award of Padma Shri, the fourth highest Indian civilian award for his services to the nation.

== Biography ==
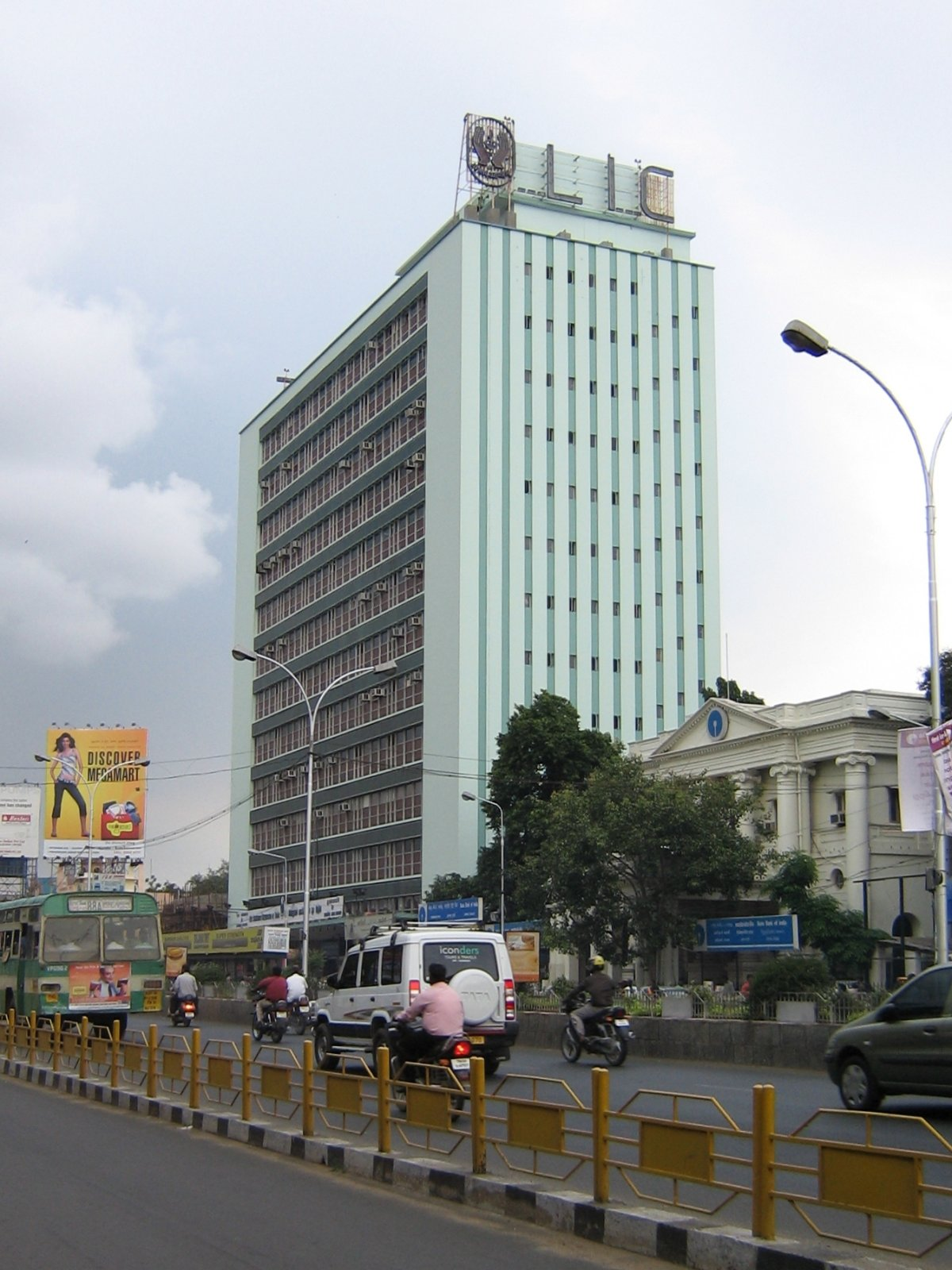
LIC building, Chennai

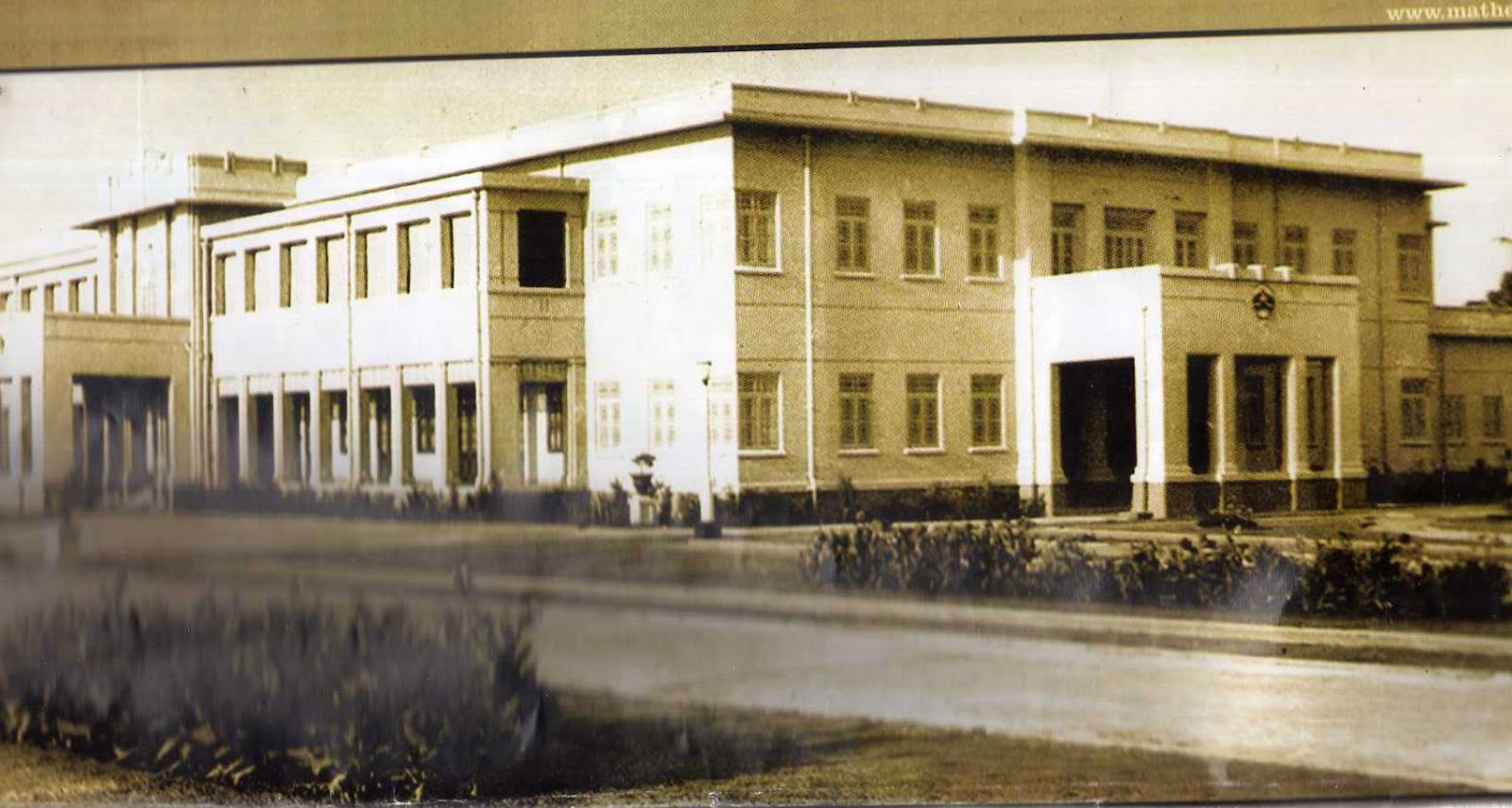
Rammohan Palace, Cochin in 1944

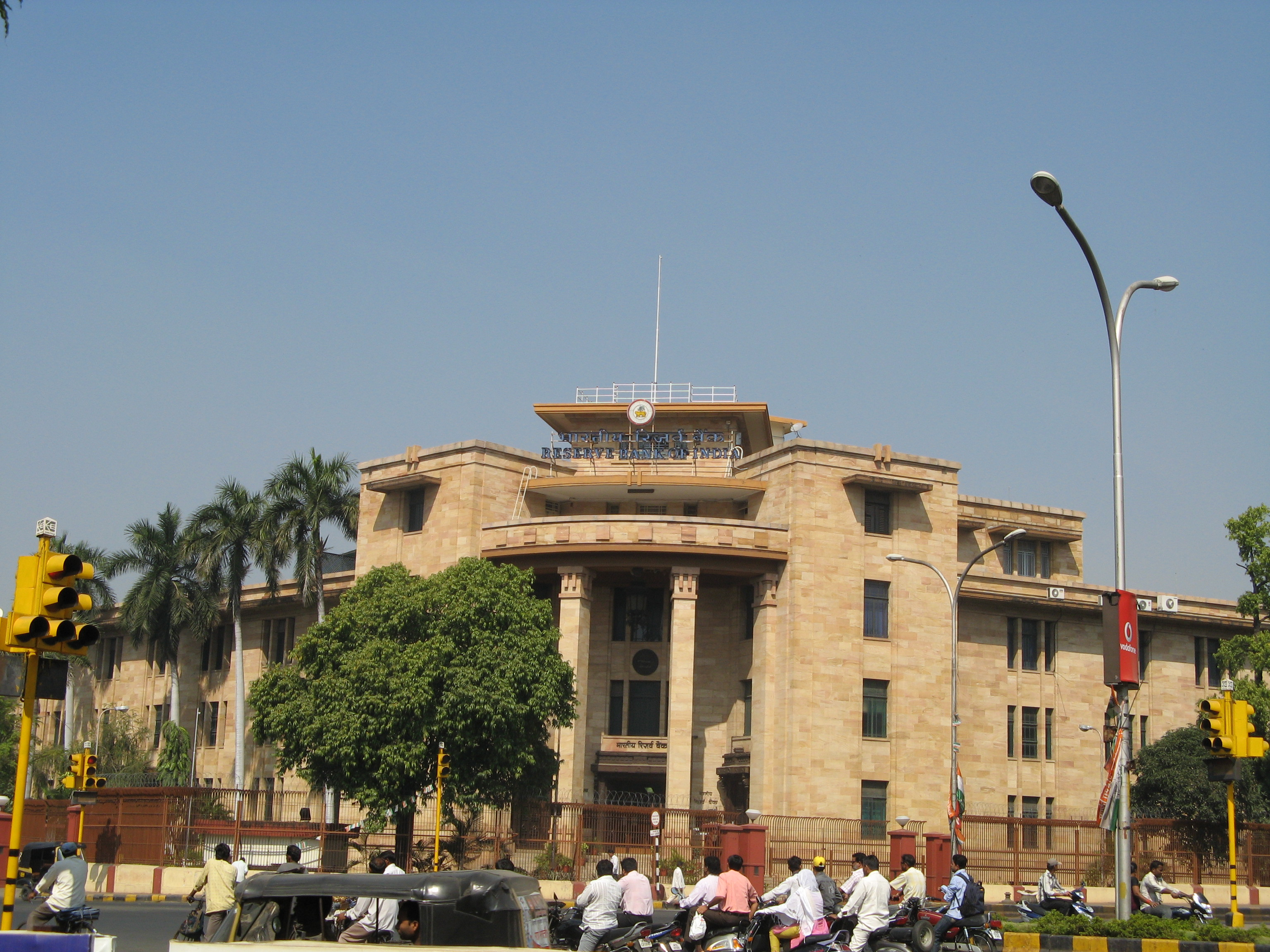
Reserve Bank building, Nagpur

Laxman Mahadeo Chitale was born in a family with meagre financial resources in 1892 in the small village of Parshuram which is around 8 km away from Chiplun, in the district of Ratnagiri of the western Indian state of Maharashtra. With a penchant for drawing, he secured a scholarship from Sayajirao Gaekwad III, then Maharaja of Baroda, and studied draughtsman's course at Kala Bhavan Technical Institute, Baroda. During this period, Chitale got an opportunity to meet Henry Vaughan Lanchester, a known architect, who hired him as his assistant. In 1922, when Lanchester shifted to UK, Chitale accompanied him. There, he joined the School of Architecture of London University for higher studies and continued learning at School of Town Planning. Later, he qualified as an associate of the Royal Institute of British Architects, followed it by securing the fellowship of the institute.

Chitale returned to India in 1929 and took up the job of an assistant consulting architect at the Public Works Department, Madras where he worked for three years. In 1932, he resigned from the government service and founded L. M. Chitale and Son, reportedly the first private architectural firm in South India. One of the first assignments he took up was for Annamalai University to design their library, administration building and convocation hall, to be built at Chidambaram. This was followed by a project for Andhra University, on recommendation from Dr. S. Radhakrishnan, who was the vice chancellor of the university. He also constructed a house for the former vice president of India in Mylapore.

The next notable project was the Oriental Life Assurance Co (Later day Oriental Insurance Co.) building along Armenian street in George Town, Chennai, which was the first multi storied building in Chennai with six floors and a basement which served as the vault. This basement was later acquired by Kothari Group who converted it as the vault of Madras Safe Deposit Company, the first safe deposit company in South India. When World War II broke out in 1941, Chitale was appointed as the Regional Camouflage Officer by the State government assigning him with the responsibility of camouflaging the city from night time raids. Chitale later brought out a book based on his work during the time, under the title, Air Raids and Civil Defense. He also carried out a series of talks which came to be known as Lantern Lectures, as he used the cinema slide projection techniques during the talks.

After the war, Chitale went back to commercial architecture and designed buildings for several other insurance companies, the best known among them being the Life Insurance Corporation building, a 14 floor high rise building on Mount Road, reported to be the first skyscraper in the city. He was the architect of several other known buildings in various parts of the country such as Ram Mohan Palace in Kochi, Reserve Bank of India building in Nagpur, Monument for Tamil poet, Subramania Bharati at Ettayapuram, Central Leather Research Institute building in Adyar and many other colleges and universities. He was also associated with academics and chaired the Board of Studies of Drawing and Architecture at University of Madras from 1941 to 1946 and served as a member of the All India Board of Technical Studies in Architecture and Regional Planning.

=== Prolific Architectural Writer ===
During L M Chitale’s stay in England for his Architecture and Town Planning studies he developed his penchant for writing. He also did a correspondence course in Journalism while he was in England. During his seven year stay there he published numerous articles that were published in journals in England as well as India.

Later on in his career writing was an important aspect. Some examples of his writings were ‘House Gardens’ printed in People’s Health Journal, 1946, where Architect Chitale details how the provision of adequate open space around a house is an essential requirement in a well-considered house plan. The Reserve Bank of India building at Nagpur received extensive publicity for its remarkable design for the time. Chitale wrote about the design and building process of the structure in the Nagpur Times in October 1956 and the April 1958 issue of Journal of the Indian Institute of Architects. His other notable writings are ‘New Buildings’ about the Construction and Design of the Pachaiyappa’s College printed in The Hindu issue of August 12, 1940 and ‘Exhibitions’ that explained the planning and purpose of exhibition in the All India Khadi and Swadeshi Exhibition Souvenir, 1938-39. Some of his writings for The Municipal Gazette, Madras are ‘City Cinemas and Civic Welfare’ in March 1939, ‘Post War Reconstruction’ – about the new order world after World War 2 and how nations could achieve stability and prosperity in September 1941, ‘Fine Arts : A Maharaja’s Contribution’ - about Maharaja of Mysore’s patronage of all forms of arts like music, preservation of monuments, revival of architecture and town planning in September 1940 and ‘The Slums’ - About the unplanned, unsanitary settlements and what is needed to solve the issue and possible solutions in 1943.

The Government of India awarded Chitale the fourth highest civilian honour of Padma Shri in 1957. He died, aged 68, in 1960; his wife, Leelavathi, who hailed from Tarapur in Maharashtra, preceding him in death. The couple had a son, Srikrishna Laxman Chitale, who is also an architect and heads of the firm his father founded.

== See also ==
- Henry Vaughan Lanchester
- Sarvepalli Radhakrishnan
