= Ram Prakash Gehlote =

Indian scientist

Ram Prakash Gehlote was awarded the Padma Shri in 1957 for his work in the fields of science and engineering.
