= Isha Basant Joshi =

Indian poet and civil servant

- Born: 31 December 1908; Lucknow
- Died: 2000s Lucknow
- Education: University of Lucknow, La Martinière College
- Occupation: Poet, civil servant

Isha Basant Joshi (born Isha Basant Mukand nom de plume of Esha Joshi; 31 December 1908, date of death after 2004) was an Indian Administrative Service officer and poet. She published books under the name of Esha Joshi. She was the first Indian to be accepted into the "Bastion of the British" school of La Martiniere Girls High School in Lucknow, India. She was the first woman Indian Administrative Services officer of British India.

== Early life and education ==
Joshi was born on 31 December 1908. After attending the La Martinere Girls High School, Lucknow, She went to Isabella Thoburn College and the Lucknow University, where she gained her Master of Arts. She undertook higher studies in Britain and then became a part of the Indian Administrative Services.

== Career ==
The first woman IAS officer of Independent India, Joshi was posted as Magistrate and then as Assistant Commissioner in Delhi. She held senior and honorable positions in various departments and became the Commissioner-cum-State-Editor of the District Gazette until 1996. She served in senior roles in the Ministry of Education. She edited a magazine before retiring from service in 1966. Joshi started her next phase of career as an author after her service as a civil servant of India. She published a number of books under the name of Esha Joshi as well as a gazateer about Bareilly under her own name in 1968.

Her poetry was admired from several sources for its range of meters and "broader feminist mission".

== Personal life ==
In 2004, it was reported that Joshi, who at that time was a 96-year-old widow, was being looked after by distant relatives in the servant quarters of a mansion on Kabir Marg in Lucknow. Following media reports, she was taken inside. In 2016 a niece reported that she had died several years ago.

== Major works ==
- Bareilly Gazateer in 1968.
- The Jewel in the Case and other stories, ISBN 81-7189-564-6
- Spindrift: Poems, ISBN 81-7189-562-X, 1994, Writers Workshop
- Sanctuary, poems, 1987
