= Lucknow Christian College =

College in Lucknow, Uttar Pradesh, India

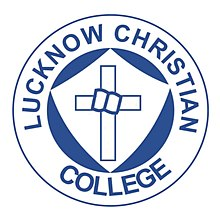
- Other names: Lcdc
- Motto: Omnia Ad Dei Gloriam (Latin)
- Motto in English: All to the glory of god
- Type: Govt. Aided College
- Established: 1862; 160 years ago
- Founders: J. H. Messmore
- Affiliations: University of Lucknow
- Principal: Naveen S. Singh
- Location: Golaganj, Lucknow, Uttar Pradesh, 226018, India
- Campus: Urban
- Language: English, Hindi, Urdu
- Website: www.lcdc.edu.in

Lucknow Christian College is a graduate and post-graduate college located in Golaganj, Lucknow, Uttar Pradesh, India. It is affiliated with the University of Lucknow.

== Brief history ==
Founded in 1862 as a tiny school in the Husainabad area of the old city of Lucknow, the college has a long and proud history. Husainabad School House was established by Rev. J. H. Messmore, a pioneer educationist missionary in Lucknow. It was later shifted to Inayat Bagh, now a part of college campus, and was raised to the level of high school in 1882.

In 1877 and 1888, the Centennial School (which was raised to high school in 1882) and Reid Christian Intermediate College were established respectively. In 1889 the college was allowed to start degree classes in arts and science.

Keeping in view the need of the professional courses, Teachers' Training College was established in 1932 and, in the same year, under the leadership of Mr. E. W. Ted Mumby, a pioneer of physical education in Northern India, the College of Physical Education was established. Lucknow Christian College in fact is older than the Lucknow University itself. Till 1921 the degree classes, which began in 1889, were affiliated to the University of Calcutta. And it was only in the year 1922, the year when Lucknow University came into existence, that the degree classes were transferred to the Canning College of Lucknow University.

However, B.Sc. and B.A. classes were restored in 1946 and 1956, respectively. In 1973 the faculty of commerce was added to the undergraduate programme of the college.

On the basis of the qualifications of the teaching faculty, performance in university examinations, library resources, and other merits, Lucknow Christian College was selected by the University Grants Commission (UGC) for the College Science Improvement Programme (COSIP) and the College Humanities and Social Sciences Improvement Programme (COHSSIP) in 1976 and 1977, respectively, to bring about qualitative improvement in teaching at the undergraduate level.

In 1995, UGC sponsored vocational courses, viz. computer applications for B.Sc. students and advertisement, sales promotion and sales management for B.Com. students, were introduced.

In 1996, the college made great strides as it was upgraded to the postgraduate level by starting M.P.Ed. classes, followed by M.A. (English) and M.Sc. (chemistry) classes in 1997.

In 1998 the Department of Statistics came into existence.

Ever since the project for a college was mooted in 1866, an extensive building work was undertaken. The Reid Hall was erected in 1891 while the Fairfield Hall and Badley Block were built in 1912 and 1921, respectively. To cater to the needs of resident scholars the Osmon Caldwell Hostel (O.C.Hostel) was constructed in 1908, followed by the Charles Lysander Bare Hostel (C.L. Bare Hostel) in 1915. However, presently accommodation is provided to outstation candidates admitted to the following professional courses only (D.P.Ed./ B.P.Ed./M.P.Ed.(Final year) & B.Ed.) However Church sponsored candidates (outstation candidates only) admitted in any faculty of the college may be considered for Hostel accommodation. A Chapel was constructed in 1952 and was dedicated to the memory of Bishop Chitambar, the first Indian Principal of the College.

In 1962, the year of the centenary of the college, the Mathews Hall, which houses the college library and the administrative offices, was completed. The foundation of the Centenary Social Centre was laid in 1962 to commemorate the historic occasion. This was completed in 1966.

The Thacore Block, an additional block to house Physics Department, was completed in 1967. A Computer Centre was set up in 1992. The college also provides its students the facilities of Career Counselling and Placement Cell, offered by the UGC. The National Cadet Corps (NCC) and the National Service Scheme (NSS) are integral parts of the college programme, open to all students.

== Overview ==
Lucknow Christian College was established in 1862. It is an Institute run by N.G.O. named Lucknow Christian College Society. It has undergraduate courses in Arts, Commerce Science, Physical education and Post-graduate courses in Chemistry and English.

The college was established much before the Lucknow University came into existence, and hence was affiliated to the Calcutta University in its early days. In 1857 and 1912, the Centennial School (which was raised to high school in 1882) and Reid Christian Intermediate College were established respectively. In 1889 the college was allowed to start degree classes in arts and science.

In view of the need for professional courses, a Teachers' Training College was established in 1932 and was named Christian Training College, in the same year, under the leadership of Mr. E. W. Ted Mumby, a pioneer of physical education in northern India, the Christian College of Physical Education was established in 1932.

== Notable alumni ==
- Zakir Husain (dropout) the third president of India was a student of the college in 1915.
- Surjit Singh Barnala the former chief minister of Punjab studied in the college in 1946.
- Shivpal Singh Yadav member of the legislative assembly, was a student in BPEd of the college in 1977.
- Arun Nehru member of the 7th, 8th and 9th Lok Sabha.
- Ishwar C. Harris expert on culture and history of India, was a student of BA in 1961.
- Hari Om Pandey a former member of parliament.
- Firaq Gorakhpuri Urdu writer and poet
- Denzil J. Godin nominated as Anglo-Indian member of 17th Uttar Pradesh Assembly
