= Kshitish Mohan Lahiri =

Kshitish Mohan Lahiri (also known as Kshiti Mohan Lahiri) was the Zamindar of Mohanpur in District Pabna (now in Sirajganj District, Bangladesh). His family was known for nationalist activities against the British rule in India. His son Rajendra Nath Lahiri was a Bengali revolutionary. Ksitish Mohan Lahiri himself was involved in various developmental activities in Pabna. In 1915, with the help of one of his close associates Rasikendra Nath Nandi he established a school named K. M. Institution at Lahiri Mohanpur, on the land donated by Kshitish Mohan Lahiri. Lahiri also provided land to build a railway station at Lahiri Mohanpur (now in Sirajganj District). In 1909, Kshitish Mohan Lahiri's family permanently sifted to Varanasi.
