= Ma Prem Usha =

Indian astrologer (1937–2008)

Ma Prem Usha (November 3, 1937 – July 17, 2008) was an Indian tarot card reader and columnist. Usha, who was well known as a clairvoyant and fortune-teller both inside Indian and abroad, travelled extensively to read her tarot cards.

== Biography ==
Ma Prem Usha was a graduate of Isabella Thoburn College in Lucknow, India. It was during the 1970s that Usha was initiated into the order of Zen mystic, Osho, an Indian guru. She remained a follower and devotee of the teachings of Osho for over 30 years until her death in 2008.

Usha and a daughter often travelled together for tarot readings throughout the world.

Usha and her granddaughter, Amira Sultan Kapoor, who is a sculptor and painter, created a new deck of tarot cards called the Saakshi Tarot Deck which is based on symbology, Indian mythology and the five elements of nature (wood, fire, earth, metal and water).

Ma Prem Usha was an Osho devotee for over three decades. She died on July 17, 2008, in New Delhi, India at the age of 70. She was survived by her husband, Lt. Col Raj Kumar Kapoor, a son, Milin Kapoor, and three daughters, Ma Prem Ritambhara (Ritambhara Dewan), Sonia Pillai, and Anjali Kapoor Ben-Sarfaradz. Cremated on the day of her death, her ashes were taken to Haridwar, by her husband and a daughter, and placed into the Ganges river.

== Author ==
Consulted and interviewed extensively by Indian and international publications on her predictions, Usha contributed weekly astrological writings and predictions to several major Indian newspapers, periodicals and websites. Her writings often touched on a wide variety of subjects including health, food, politics, fashion and people. She also authored 12 books on the twelve signs of the zodiac.
