= Aindrila Mukhopadhyay =

American scientist

- Born: India
- Education: University of Chicago; Indian Institute of Technology; Isabella Thoburn College
- Scientific career
- Workplaces: Lawrence Berkeley National Laboratory; Emory University
- Thesis: Initiating lateral gene transfer : analysis of the VirA/VirG two component system in vivo (2002)

Aindrila Mukhopadhyay is an American scientist who is the Division Deputy of the Biological Systems and Engineering Division at Lawrence Berkeley National Laboratory. Her research involves microbial engineering for the production of biofuels. She was nominated a Fellow of the American Association for the Advancement of Science in 2022. In 2025 Mukhopadhyay was elected a Fellow of the American Academy of Microbiology.

== Early life and education ==
Mukhopadhyay is from West Bengal, India. Her father is a surgeon and a painter. She was a bachelor's student in chemistry and zoology at the Isabella Thoburn College. For her postdoctoral research, she studied chemistry at the Indian Institute of Technology. She moved to the University of Chicago in 1996, where she worked toward a doctorate in organic chemistry. She held a joint position at Emory University. After earning her doctorate, Mukhopadhyay joined Lawrence Berkeley National Laboratory as a postdoctoral researcher.

== Research and career ==
Mukhopadhyay leads biological systems and engineering at the Lawrence Berkeley National Laboratory, where she engineers microbes to make sustainable and low-cost chemicals. She studies biological processes (e.g. stress response, signaling and membrane transport) in microbial systems. Mukhopadhyay makes use of a variety of biochemical approaches to understand environmentally important model (sulphate and cyanobacteria) and non-model organisms (Pseudomonas stutzeri, Desulfovibrio vulgaris and Agrobacterium tumefaciens). She is part of the United States Department of Energy Enigma project.

Mukhopadhyay combines protein and host engineering to improve the production fuels, using microbes such as Escherichia coli and Corynebacterium glutamicum. In 2016, Mukhopadhyay engineered a bacterial strain that can permit the one-pot production of biofuels from a slurry. The strain had an amino acid mutation on the rcd gene, and was particularly tolerant to ionic liquids.

Alongside her work on biofuels, Mukhopadhyay has investigated environmentally-friendly pigments. She investigated how well Rhodosporidium toruloides can express nonribosomal peptide synthetases. She showed that Rhodosporidium toruloides (a fungus) bioengineered to convert amino acid molecules into indigoidine, a blue pigment that can be used in the textile industry. She showed that for every liter of bioreactor culture it was possible to generate 86 grams of indigoidine, which was the highest yield ever reported.

Muchpadhyay is vice president of the Biofuels and Bioproducts Division at the Joint BioEnergy Institute (JBEI), where she oversees host engineering.

== Awards and honors ==
- 2019 Finalist C3E Awards: Mid-career women in clean energy
- 2022 Fellow of the American Association for the Advancement of Science
- 2025 Fellow of the American Academy of Microbiology

== Selected publications ==
- Pamela P Peralta-Yahya; Mario Ouellet; Rossana Chan; Aindrila Mukhopadhyay; Jay D Keasling; Taek Soon Lee (27 September 2011). "Identification and microbial production of a terpene-based advanced biofuel". Nature Communications. 2: 483. Bibcode:2011NatCo...2..483P. doi:10.1038/ncomms1494. ISSN 2041-1723. PMC 3195254. PMID 21952217. Wikidata Q35367025.
- Mary J Dunlop; Zain Y Dossani; Heather L Szmidt; Hou Cheng Chu; Taek Soon Lee; Jay Keasling; Masood Z Hadi; Aindrila Mukhopadhyay (1 May 2011). "Engineering microbial biofuel tolerance and export using efflux pumps". Molecular Systems Biology. 7: 487. doi:10.1038/msb.2011.21. ISSN 1744-4292. PMC 3130554. PMID 21556065. Wikidata Q33893674.
- J L Fortman; Swapnil Chhabra; Aindrila Mukhopadhyay; Howard Chou; Taek Soon Lee; Eric Steen; Jay D Keasling (28 May 2008). "Biofuel alternatives to ethanol: pumping the microbial well". Trends in Biotechnology. 26 (7): 375–381. doi:10.1016/j.tibtech.2008.03.008. ISSN 0167-7799. PMID 18471913. Wikidata Q37159977.

== Personal life ==
Outside of the lab Mukhopadhyay is an artist who sketches the buildings of her neighbourhood, San Francisco's Mission District.
