= Roshan Taqui =

Indian historian

- Born: 1958 (age 67–68); Lucknow
- Occupation: Writer

Roshan Taqui is an Indian historian specialising on Lucknow and its culture.

== Personal life ==
Roshan Taqui was born in 1958 at Lucknow.

He is an alumnus of AMU and Ph.D from Lucknow University on ‘Lucknow Monuments – Preservation, Conservation Solutions’.

Taqui's great-grandfather and great grand-uncle were killed in Lucknow during the 1857 uprising.

== Professional life ==
Taqui has written numerous books and published more than 140 research papers on history and cultural heritage of Avadh in English, Hindi and Urdu.

His book Lucknow Ki Bhand Parampara ("The Traditions of the clown of Lucknow") is the only book on the subject. He has also written two books on contribution of rulers of Avadh to Indian music and dance viz., Bani and Chanchal.

He has also written and directed three short films on adult education and prohibition and directed 14 plays.

Roshan Taqui is member secretary of HARCA (the Historical & Archaeological Research and Conservation Agency), which is looking after conservation and restoration of heritage buildings at Lucknow.

== Publications ==
=== English ===
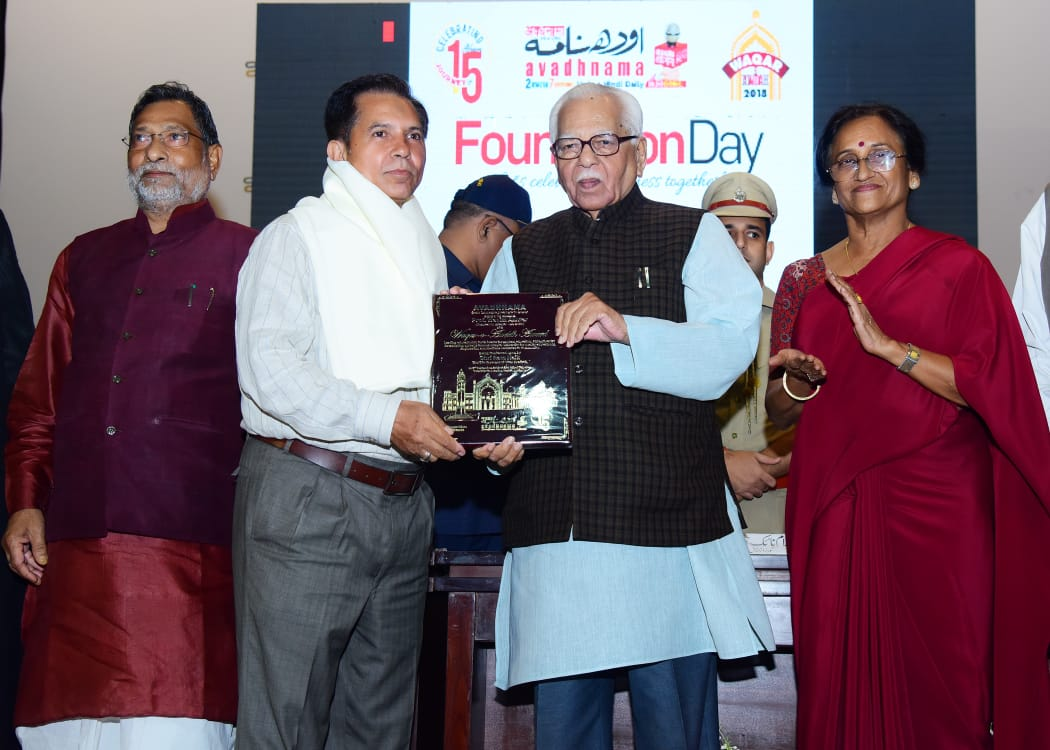
Roshan Taqui receiving Waqar-e-Avadh award by Avadhnama, a bilingual daily, from Ram Naik, Governor of UP.

- Avadh Dastavez
- Images of Lucknow, 2007, New Royal Book Co. ISBN 978-81-89267-04-9
- Lucknow 1857: The Two Wars of Lucknow, Dusk of an Era, 2001, New Royal Book Co. ISBN 978-81-85936-08-6
- Lucknow Conservation, International Dimensions
- Lucknow Monuments – Conservation, Preservations Solutions
- Begum Hazrat Mahal

=== Hindi ===
- Bani - Sangeet Sankalan
- Lucknow ki Bhand Parampara
- Lucknow kay Miraasi
- Chanchal - Sangeet Sankalan
- Dulhan - Sangeet Sankalan
- Sautul Mubarak
- Begum Hazrat Mahal
- 1857 kay Baad Lucknow ki Barbaadi
- Aaha Mirza Kambalposh - Lucknow ka Pahla Krantiveer
- Wajid Ali Shah - Ek Sufi ek Sant
- Anuvaad - Shad Azimabaadi

=== Urdu ===
- Khushboo - Urdu dramoN ka Majmua
- Ajayab Nagar - Yakbaabi Almiya DramoN ka MajmuaaN
- Daadajaan ne Kaha Tha - Do Baabi Tarbiya DramoN ka MamuaaN
