= Denzil J. Godin =

Indian doctor

Denzil John Godin is an Indian doctor who served as the nominated Anglo-Indian member of 17th Uttar Pradesh Assembly, by Ram Naik. He also served as Associate Professor at Botany Department in Lucknow Christian College. In 2011, he became life time member of Indian Botanical Society.

== Personal life ==
He was born on 24 August 1966, in Lucknow, to Denzil Francis Joseph Godin. He married Leena B. Godin in 1997, and has two sons.
