= Isabella Thoburn College =

Indian women's college

- Former name: Lucknow Women's College
- Motto in English: "We receive to give"
- Established: 18 April 1870; 156 years ago
- Founder: Isabella Thoburn
- Affiliations: University of Lucknow & Dr. A.P.J. Abdul Kalam Technical University
- Location: Lucknow, Uttar Pradesh, 226007, India; 26°52′18″N 80°56′32″E
- Campus: Urban
- Colors: Gold and White
- Website: itcollege.ac.in

The Isabella Thoburn College (formerly the Lucknow Women's College and often called informally IT College) is a private multidisciplinary (humanities, social sciences, sciences, commerce, management and engineering) college for women in Lucknow, India, named after its founder, Isabella Thoburn, the first woman American missionary of the Methodist Episcopal Church to sail in India 1869. The college was established in 1870 with just six girls on roll. This college has 2 units, one degree college (humanities, social sciences, commerce and sciences) section affiliated with University of Lucknow and one professional studies (management and engineering) section affiliated with Dr. A.P.J. Abdul Kalam Technical University.

The IT Chauraha Metro Station is named after the college and lies next to it, connecting it with the Red Line.

== History ==
The origin of the college was in a school for girls opened by Isabella Thoburn on 18 April 1870 in one room in Aminabad bazaar of Lucknow. There were then just six girls. By 1871, the school had expanded and moved to occupy a house named Lal Bagh, which had been lived in by the treasurer of the last Nawab of Awadh.

On 12 July 1886 Miss Thoburn's school was renamed as the Lucknow Women's College and began to teach Fine Arts classes under the supervision of the University of Calcutta. In 1894, this connection was abandoned in favour of a new one with Allahabad University. Following the death of Miss Thoburn in 1901, the college, still at Lal Bagh, was given its present name in her honour. In 1923, it moved to the Chand Bagh estate of almost 32 acres, where it has remained until the present day. Chand Bagh means "moon garden". The property was once a royal garden. After its affiliation to Lucknow University it found requisite support and guidance from Nirmal Chandra Chaturvedi, a renowned educationist and member of the university Executive Council.

The college's Principal Sarah Chakko (1905–1954) was the first woman president of the World Council of Churches.

== Present day ==
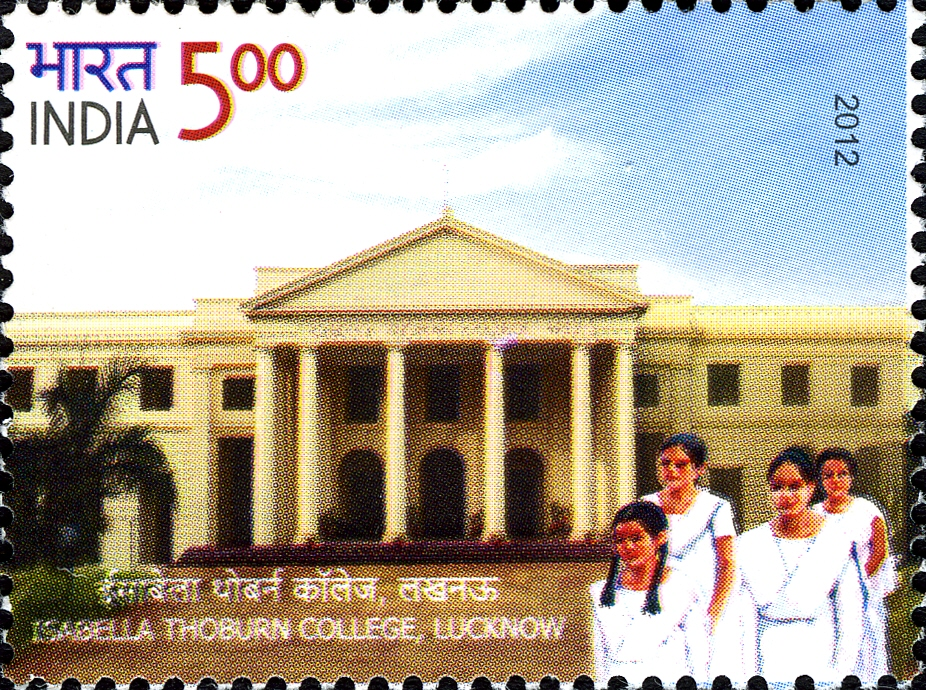
Isabella Thoburn College on a 2012 stamp of India

The college is now affiliated to Dr. A.P.J. Abdul Kalam Technical University for engineering and management courses and for all other courses it is affiliated to the University of Lucknow. The buildings it has developed on the Chand Bagh campus since the 1920s include student hostels, lecture rooms, laboratories, a library, a college chapel and an auditorium. The college teaches seven undergraduate courses, leading to the degrees of Bachelor of Technology (BTech), Bachelor of Arts (BA), Bachelor of Education (BEd), Bachelor of Science (BSc), Bachelor of Commerce (BCom), Bachelor of Business Administration (BBA) and Bachelor of Library and Information Science (BLISc). There are also postgraduate courses leading to the degrees of Master of Arts (MA), Master of Science(MSc), Master of Business Administration (MBA) and a Postgraduate Diploma in Healthcare and Hospital Management (PGDHHM).

Isabella Thoburn College, along with undergraduate and post graduate courses also offered intermediate classes. Eventually a separate college for intermediate level students was formed within the Isabella Thoburn College campus. This building only houses classes 11th and 12th, while the college level students study in the old college building.

Isabella Thoburn College has hostel facilities for students as well as has a large number of day scholars. There are three hostels for the resident students, Naunihal, Nishat Mahal and Maitreyi Bhawan.

On 12 April 2012, the Government of India issued a new five rupee postage stamp illustrating the college.

== Chapel Inside the College Campus ==
Value-based education emphasizes the importance of spirituality in shaping moral behavior. Incorporating religious studies in the education system helps guide students toward spirituality, which is associated with qualities like love, honesty, and humility. Chapel worship services, held regularly in college chapels and auditoriums, focus on Biblical teachings and values such as honesty, respect, self-discipline, kindness, and forgiveness, promoting character development among students.

== Principals ==
- Isabella Thoburn
- Sarah Chakko
- Dr. Eva Shipstone
- Dr. Kamala D. Edwards
- Ms. Mary Abraham
- Dr. Adella Paul
- Dr. E. S. Charles
- Dr. Primrose H. Bodhan
- Mrs. K. Sen
- Dr. Vinita Prakash
- Dr.Panzy Singh
- Dr.(Maj). Neerja Masih(present)

== Notable alumnae ==
- Smt. Bindumati Devi (19 July 1918 – 22 July 2002) , Politician ; Member of the Legislative Assembly in Uttar Pradesh from Pratapganj, Barabanki (1957-1962) and Member of Parliament in the Rajya Sabha (1967 to 1972)
- Nabia Abbott (31 January 1897 – 15 October 1981), Islamic scholar, papyrologist, paleographer at the University of Chicago Oriental Institute
- Lilavati Singh (14 December 1868 – 9 May 1909), educator, also taught at the college
- Martha Chen (born 1944), American academic, lecturer in public policy at the Harvard Kennedy School
- Rashid Jahan (1905–1952), Urdu Writer.
- Isha Basant Joshi (born 1908), first female officer of the Indian Administrative Service and writer, also known by the pen name Easha Joshi
- Attia Hosain (1913–1998), feminist author and broadcaster
- Ismat Chugtai (August 1915 – 24 October 1991), eminent Indian writer in Urdu
- Vijayaraje Scindia (1919–2001), politician, consort of the last ruling Maharaja of Gwalior
- Qurratulain Hyder (1928–2007), novelist
- Bina Rai (1936–2009), actress
- Ma Prem Usha (1937-2008), clairvoyant and columnist
- Fatima Zakaria (1936-2021), former editor of the Bombay Times and Sunday editor of The Times of India
- Dr. Mohini Giri, first chairperson of National Commission for Women in India
- Vartika Singh, model, Femina Miss India Grand International finalist 2015, second Runner Up
- Nivedita Bhattacharya, theatre and television actress
- Aindrila Mukhopadhyay, Scientist and Division Lead at the Lawrence Berkeley National Laboratory

== See also ==
- Methodist High School, Kanpur
