= Sukhdev Pande =

Indian academic admin

Sukhdev Pande (1893 - 1979 ) was an Indian academic administrator associated with the educational institutions managed by the Birla Education Trust. He guided the establishment of the Birla Institute of Technology and Science (BITS) at the Vidya Vihar campus in Pilani in Rajasthan. A statue of Sukhdev Pande adorns the main doorway leading to the Auditorium in BITS. Before starting his career with Birla Education Trust, Pande was an assistant professor in Mathematics at the Benares Hindu University. As requested by Pandit Madan Mohan Malaviya, the founder and the first Vice-Chancellor of BHU, Pande moved to Pilani in 1929 and took charge as the Principal of the then recently established Intermediate College in Pilani. He stayed in Pilani for over 40 years and oversaw the development and transformation of the Intermediate College into the present day BITS.

In 1956, Govt of India conferred on Pande the Padma Shri award, the fourth highest civilian award in India, for his services in the field of literature and education. He was the first person from the region of India which now constitute the Uttarakhand State in India to receive this honor.
