= Isabella Thoburn =

American missionary (1840–1901)

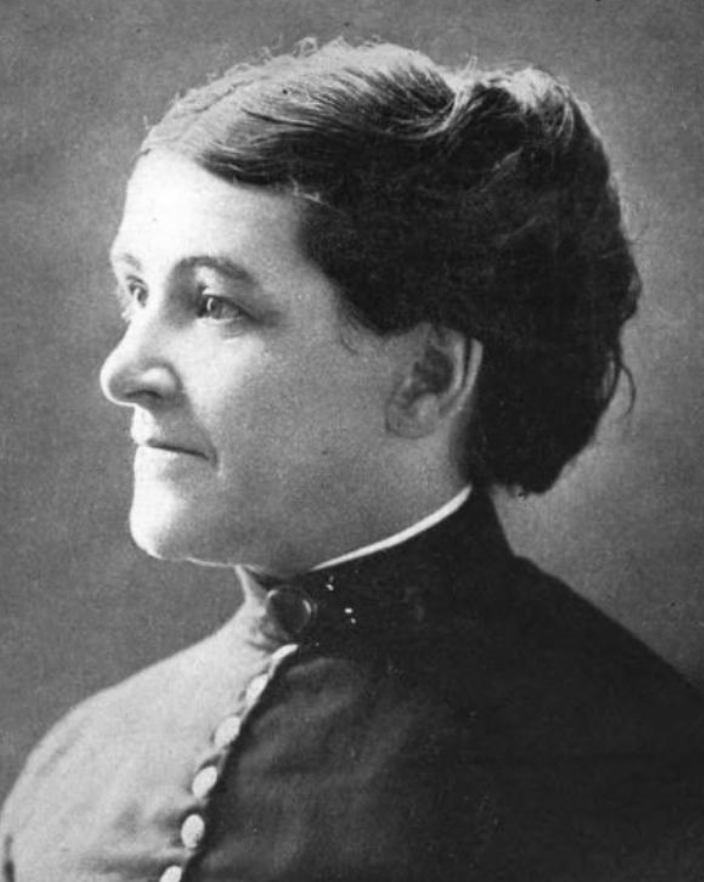
- Isabella Thoburn, missionary and educator, from a 1901 publication
- Born: March 29, 1840; Ohio, US
- Died: September 1, 1901 (aged 61); Lucknow, India
- Occupations: Missionary educator, college administrator

Isabella Thoburn (March 29, 1840 – Sept. 1, 1901) was an American Christian missionary of the Methodist Episcopal Church best known for her establishment of educational institutions and missionary work in North India, subsequent to the East India Company's relinquishment of power to the British government in India.

== Biography ==
Isabella Thoburn was born in 1840 near St. Clairsville, Ohio. She attended local schools and the Wheeling Female Seminary in Wheeling, Virginia (now in West Virginia).

Thoburn was invited to Cincinnati to train Christian missionaries and deaconesses to serve, resulting in the formation of The Christ Hospital.

In 1866, after she had taught for several years, Isabella was invited by her brother James Mills Thoburn, a Methodist Episcopal missionary in India, to assist him in his educational and missionary work in India. She delayed her departure until 1869 when the formation of the Women's Foreign Missionary Society of the Methodist Episcopal Church enabled her to undertake missionary work under denominational affiliation and auspices.

In India, Thoburn's work culminated in the founding of an important woman's college, Isabella Thoburn College in Lucknow (1870), as well as a Methodist High School in Kanpur. These two educational establishments were among the first in colonial India, catering to the educational and religious needs of an emergent Anglo Indian population in Awadh.

Thoburn returned to the United States for a period to study at Lucy Rider Meyer's Chicago Training School for City, Home, and Foreign Missions in Illinois. In 1887, Meyer appointed her as the first house mother and superintendent of the school's new Methodist Deaconess Home for training female deacons.

She died in 1901 in Lucknow, India, at the age of 61.

== See also ==
- List of bishops of the United Methodist Church

== Citations ==
=== Sources ===
- Buck, Oscar MacMillan (1936). Malone, Dumas (ed.). Dictionary of American biography: Thoburn. Vol. XVIII. New York: Charles Scribner's Sons. pp. 418–420.
- Methodism: Ohio Area (1812–1962), edited by John M. Versteeg, Litt.D., D.D. (Ohio Area Sesquicentennial Committee, 1962).
- Thoburn, J. M. (1903). Life of Isabella Thoburn. Cincinnati, OH: Jenkins and Graham.
