= Asangi =

- village
- Location in Karnataka, India Asangi (India)
- Coordinates: 16.4994°N 75.1230°E
- Country: India
- State: Karnataka
- District: Bagalkot
- Talukas: Jamkhandi

Population (2011)
  - Total: 5,787

Languages
  - Official: Kannada
- Time zone: UTC+5:30 (IST)
- Postal code: 587311

Asangi is a village in the southern state of Karnataka, India. It is located in the Jamkhandi taluk of Bagalkot district in Karnataka. They speak different languages: Kannada, Marathi, Urdu. It is 774 feet above sea level. The minuscule village belongs to the Mysore Division. The literacy rate of the village is 74.6%.

== Demographics ==
As of 2011 India census, Asangi had a population of 5787 with 2953 males and 2834 females.

== See also ==
- Bagalkot
- Districts of Karnataka
