= Kshitish Ranjan Chakravorty =

Indian engineer, fertilizer scientist (born 1916)

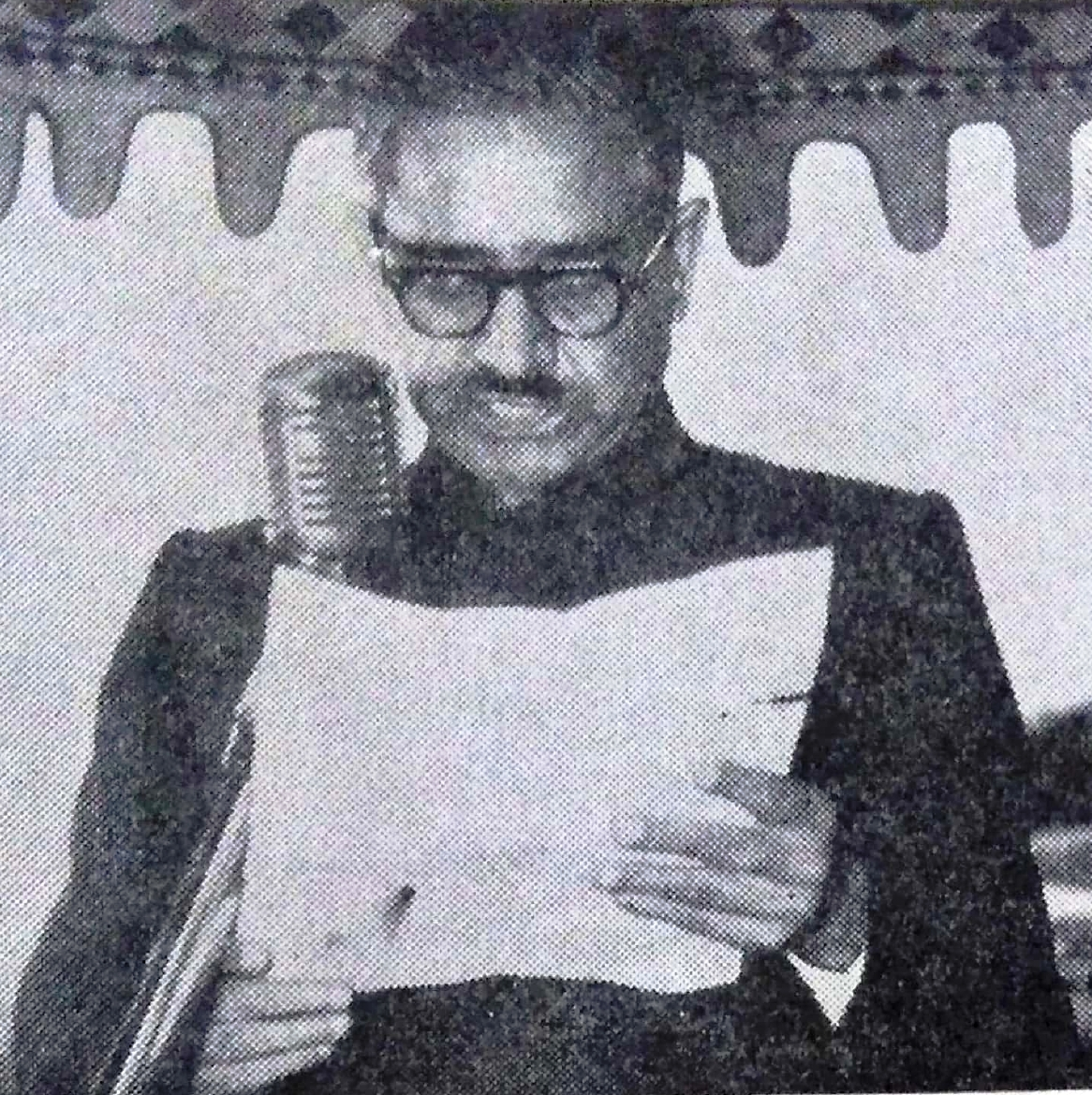
- Kshitish Ranjan Chakravorty
- Born: 1 February 1916; West Bengal, India
- Died: 29 September 1994 (aged 78)
- Known for: Development of fertilizer plants in India
- Awards: 1954 Padma Shri; 1968 Shanti Swarup Bhatnagar Prize
- Scientific career
- Fields: Fertilizer science
- Institutions: Fertilizer Corporation of India

Kshitish Ranjan Chakravorty (1 February 1916 – 29 September 1994) was an Indian engineer, fertilizer scientist and the head of the Planning and Development Division of the Fertilizer Corporation of India (FCI). He was credited with the establishment of Planning and Development Division of FCI and with the development indigenous fertilizer plants in India. Born on 1 February 1916, Chakravorty was the author of two books, Science Based on Symmetry, Volume 1 and Energy Field of the Universe and Atom, Part 1 and he held the patent for a process on an ionexchange material from the acid sludge. He sat in the Committee on Tachnical Consultancy Services of the Government of India and was an Indian member of the Indo-US Workshop on the Management of Organization of Industrial Research held in 1970. He received the fourth highest Indian civilian award, the Padma Shri, in 1954, making him one of the earliest recipients of the award. The Council of Scientific and Industrial Research, the apex agency of the Government of India for scientific research, awarded him the Shanti Swarup Bhatnagar Prize for Science and Technology, one of the highest Indian science awards for his contributions to Engineering Sciences in 1968.
