= Commuter rail =

Passenger rail transport services primarily within metropolitan areas

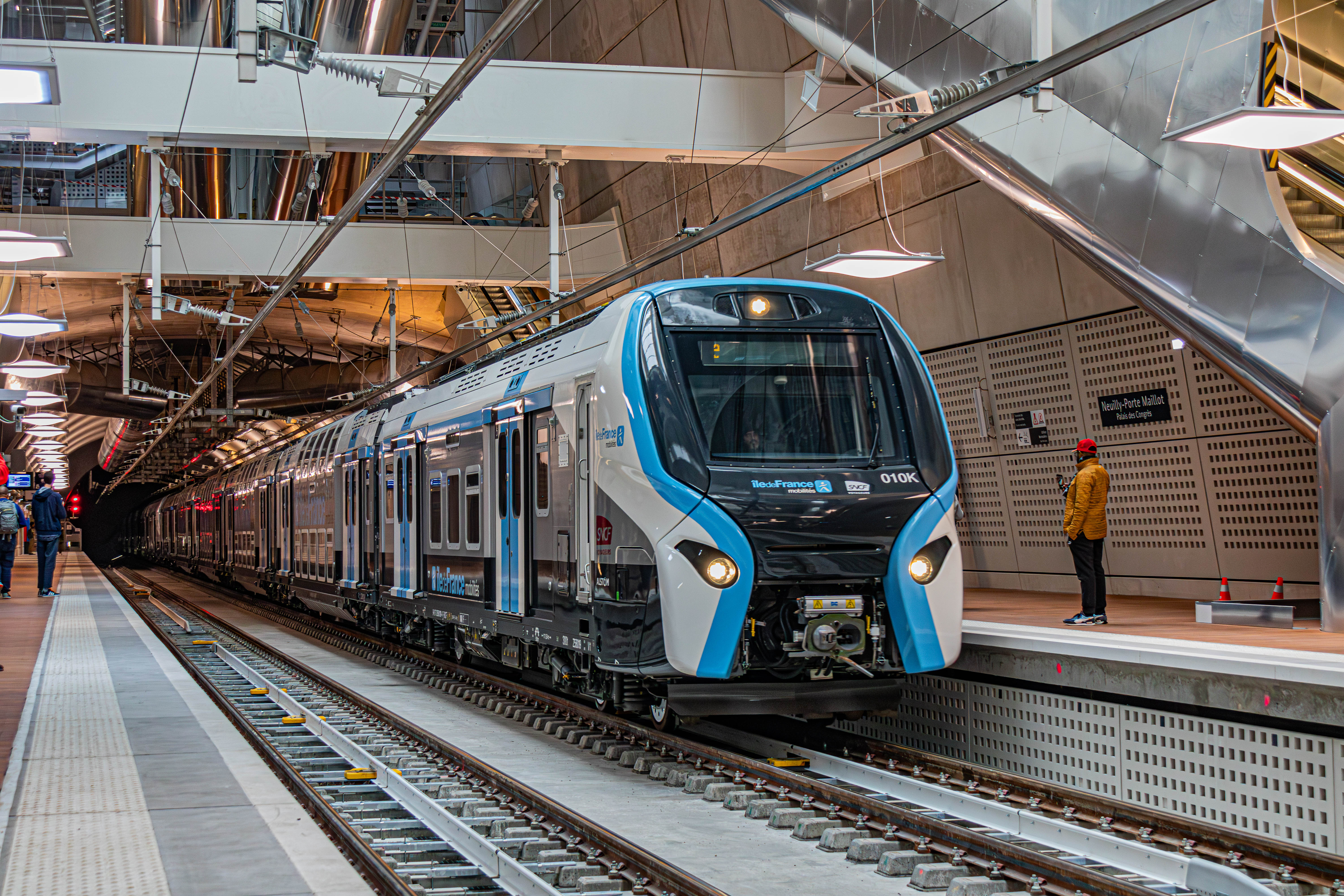
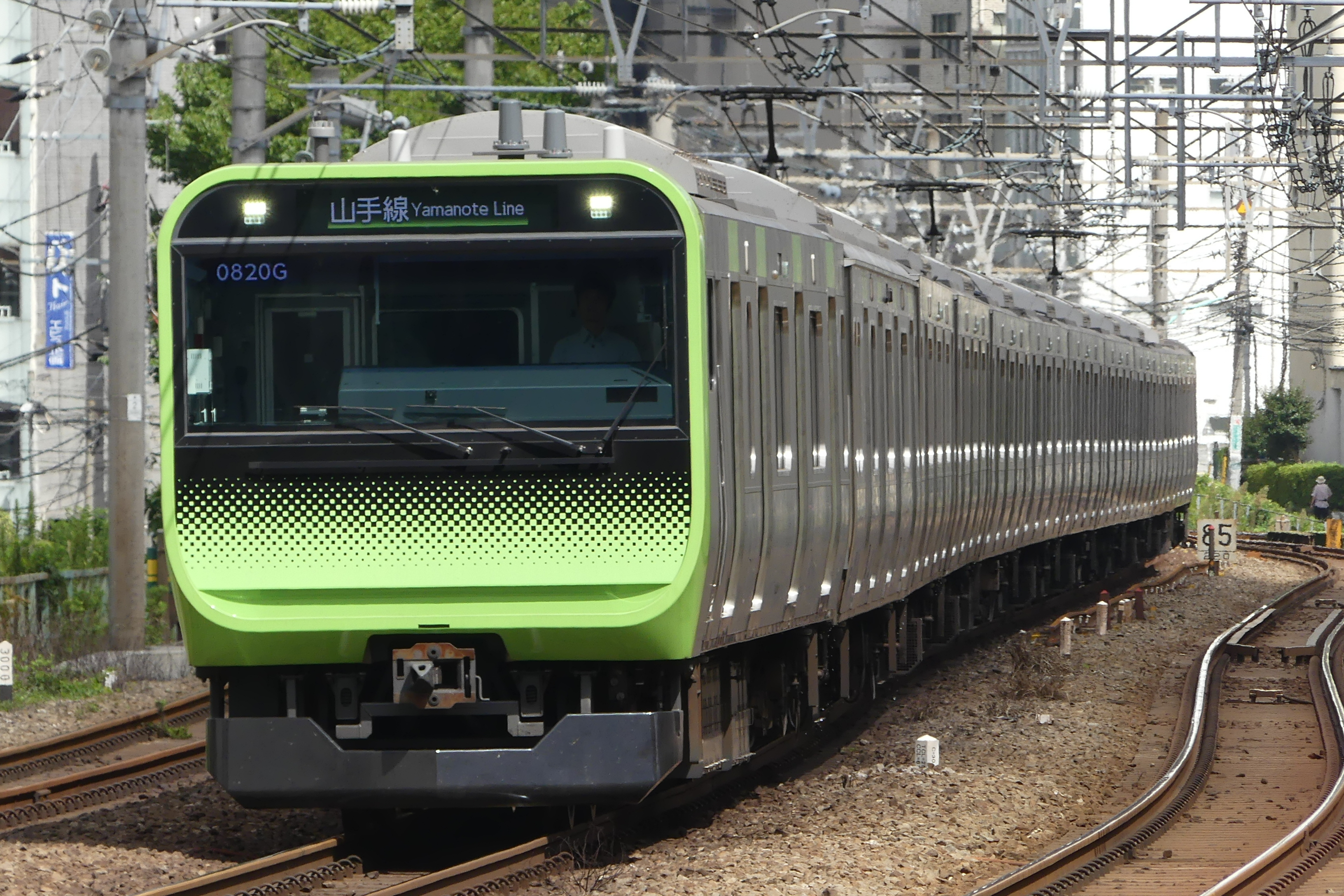
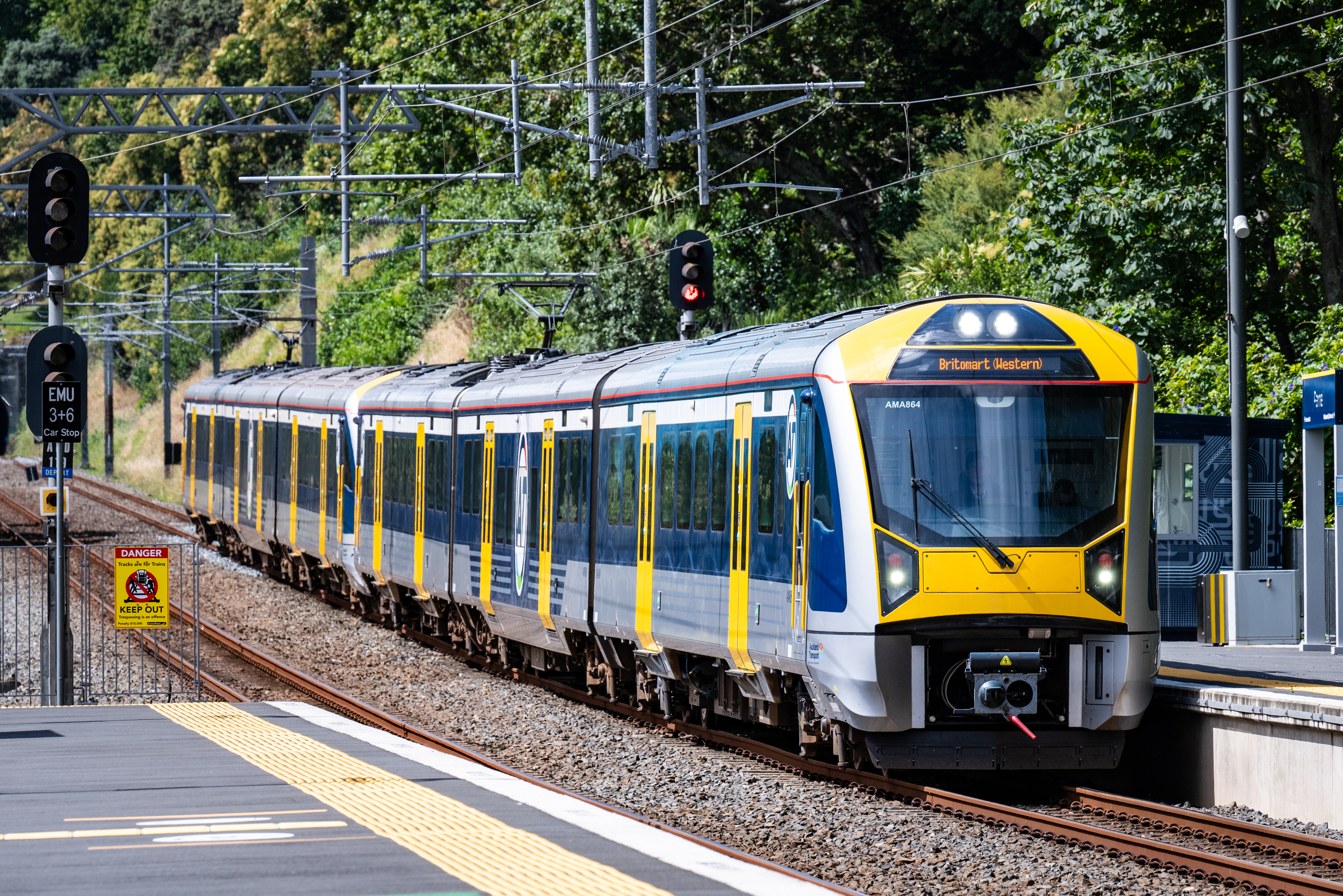
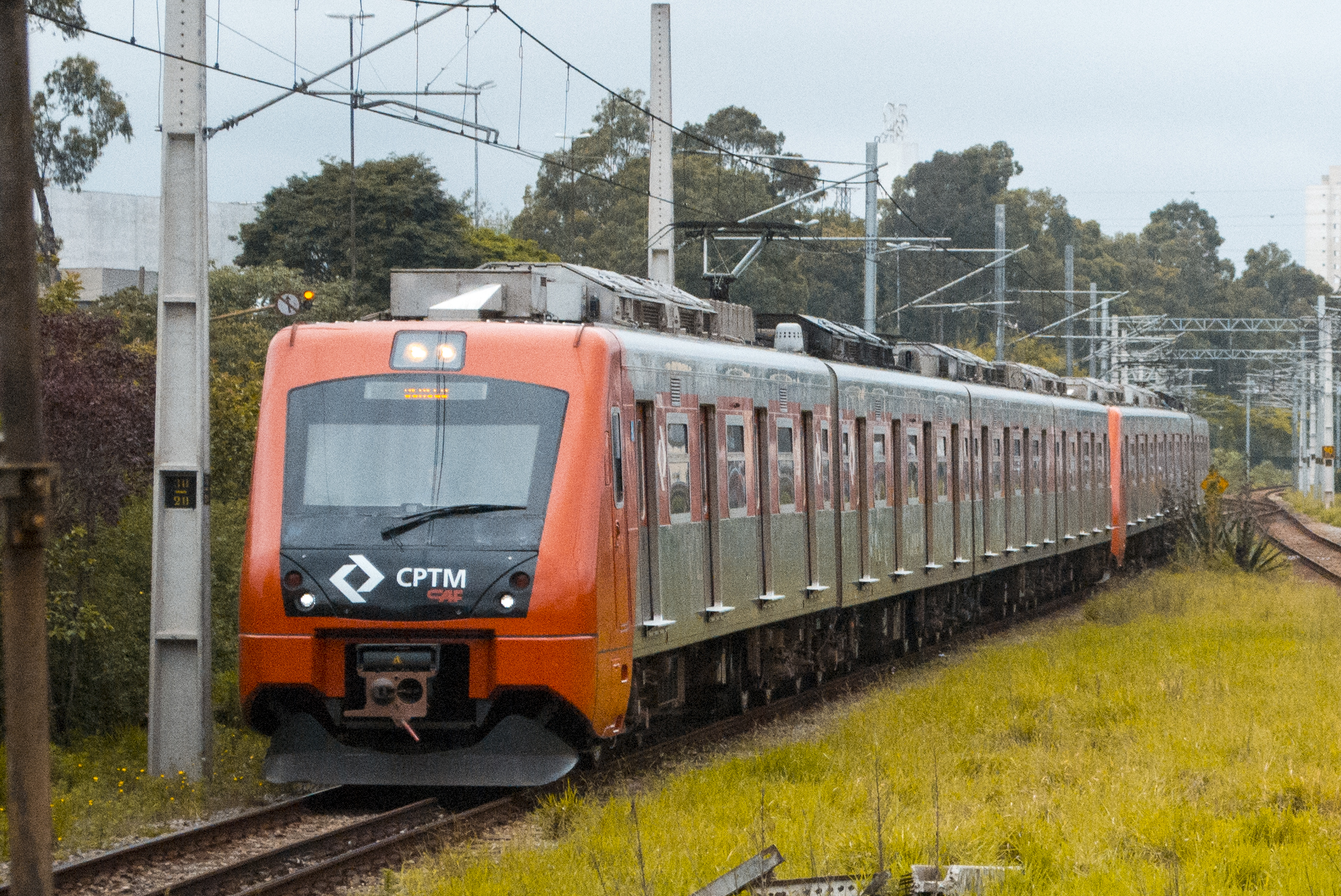
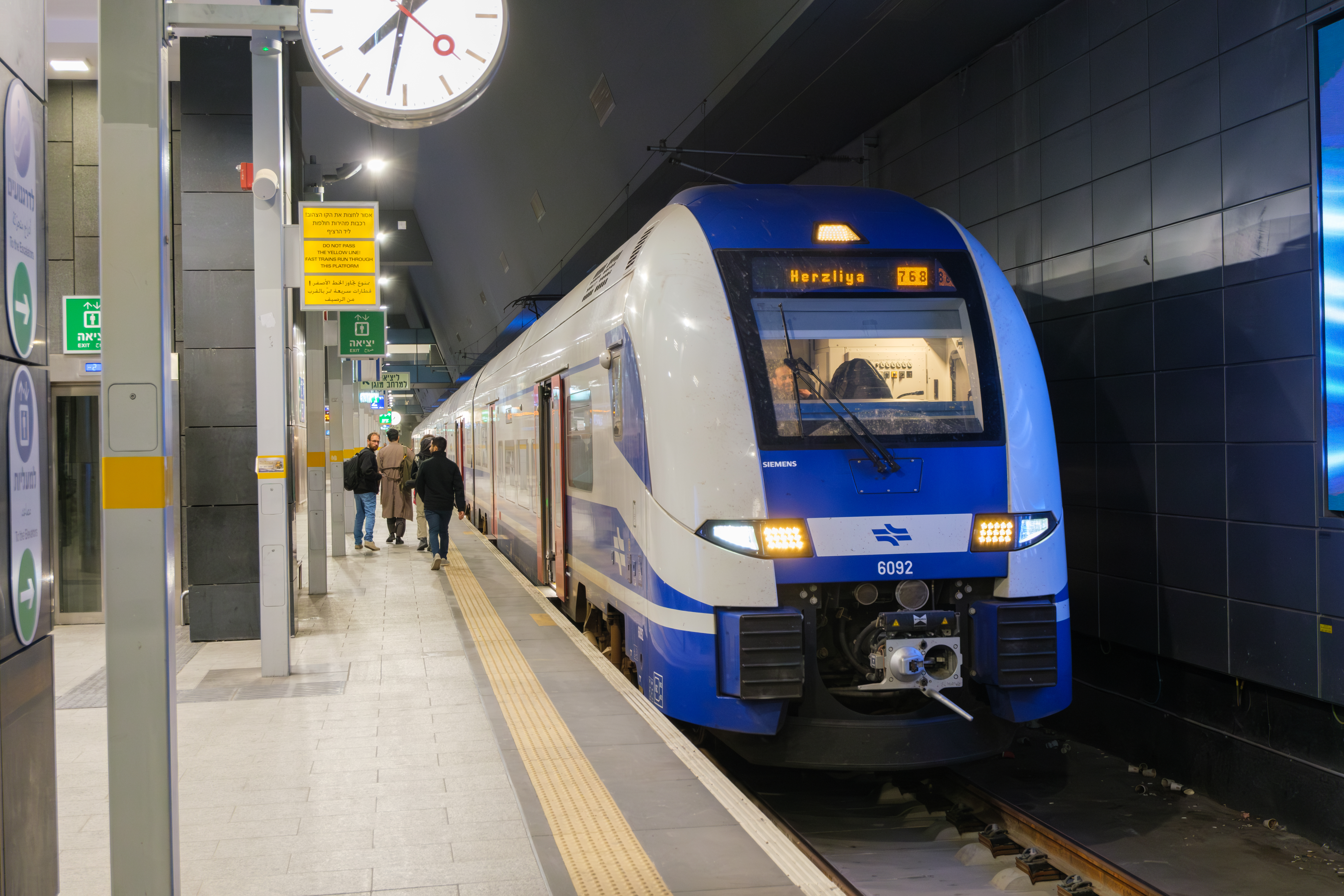
Clockwise from top left:
- A Metra train of Gallery Cars hauled by an F40PH on the Union Pacific North Line in Chicago
- An RER NG train on line E of the Réseau Express Régional in Paris
- An AM class electric multiple unit used in Auckland
- An Israel Railways train in Jerusalem
- A CPTM train on the Coral Line in São Paulo
- An E235 series EMU of the Yamanote Line railway in Tokyo

Commuter rail, or suburban rail is a passenger rail service that primarily operates within a metropolitan area, connecting the central city to its suburbs and commuter towns. Commuter rail systems can use locomotive-hauled trains or multiple units, using electric or diesel propulsion. Distance-based charges or fare zone-based pricing may be used.

The term can refer to systems with a wide variety of different features and service frequencies, but typically refers to mainline rail services connecting suburban communities with central business districts over medium distances; it is distinguished from rapid transit systems, which operate inside the urban core.

Some services blur the line between suburban rail and rapid transit; examples include German S-Bahn in some cities, the Réseau Express Régional (RER) in Paris, the S Lines in Milan, the Elizabeth line in London, many Japanese commuter systems, the East Rail line in Hong Kong, and some Australasian suburban networks, such as Sydney Trains and Metro Trains Melbourne. Many commuter rail systems share tracks with other passenger services and freight.

Outside of the New York metropolitan area, commuter rail in North America sometimes refers only to systems that primarily operate during rush hour and offer little to no service for the rest of the day, with regional rail being used to refer to systems that do offer all-day services.

== Characteristics ==
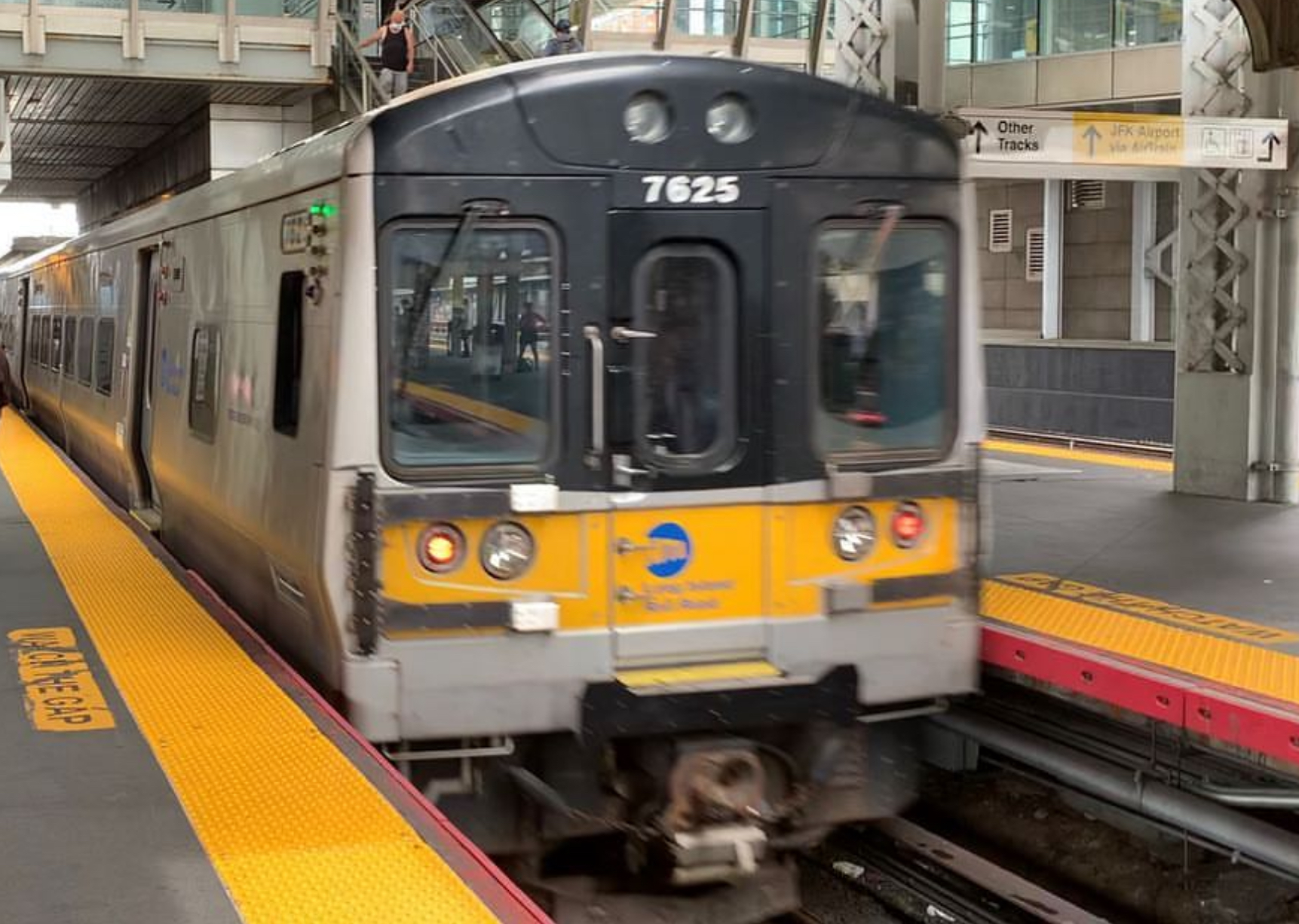
The LIRR is the busiest commuter rail system in North America.

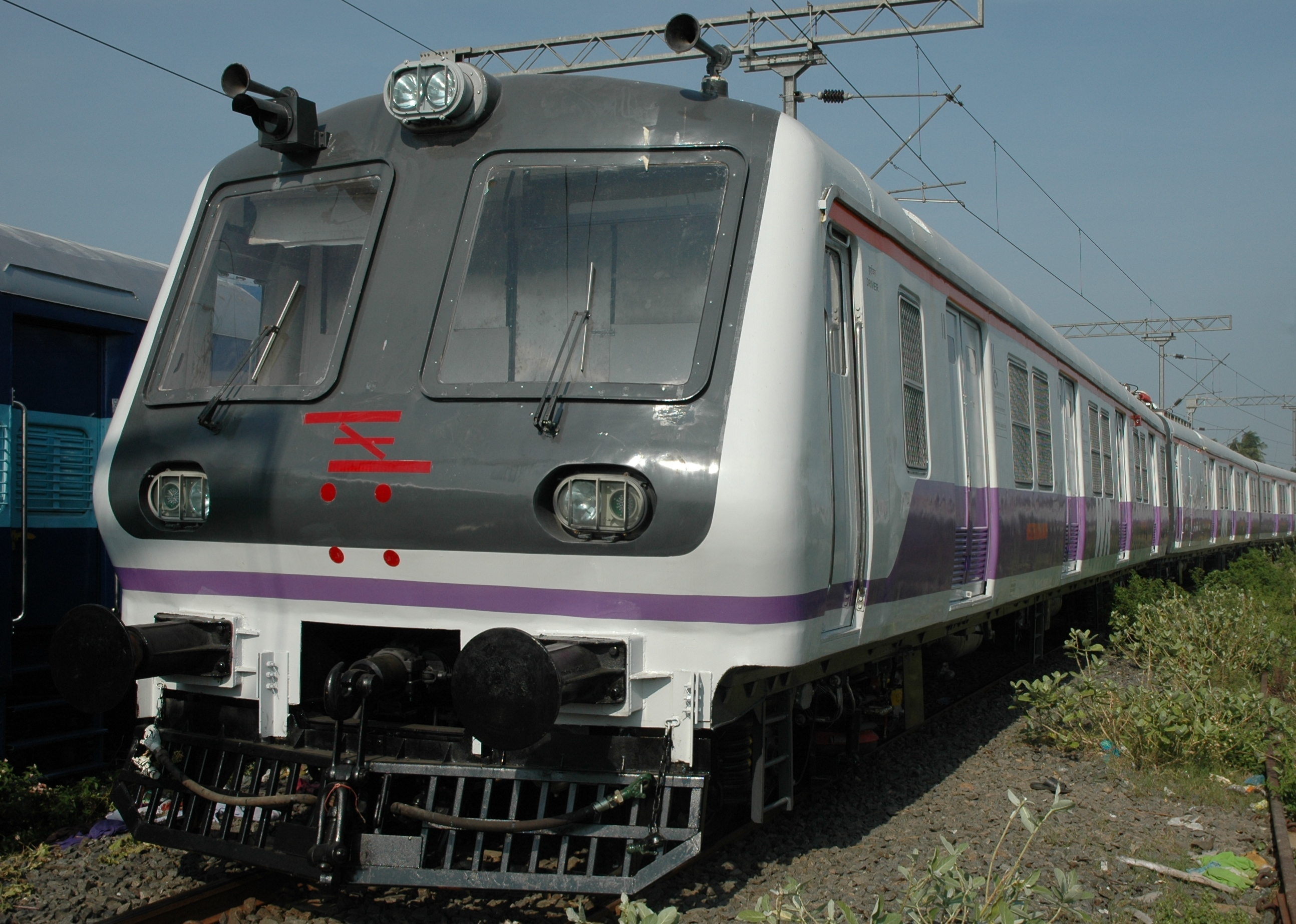
Mumbai Suburban Railway carries more than 7.24 million commuters daily

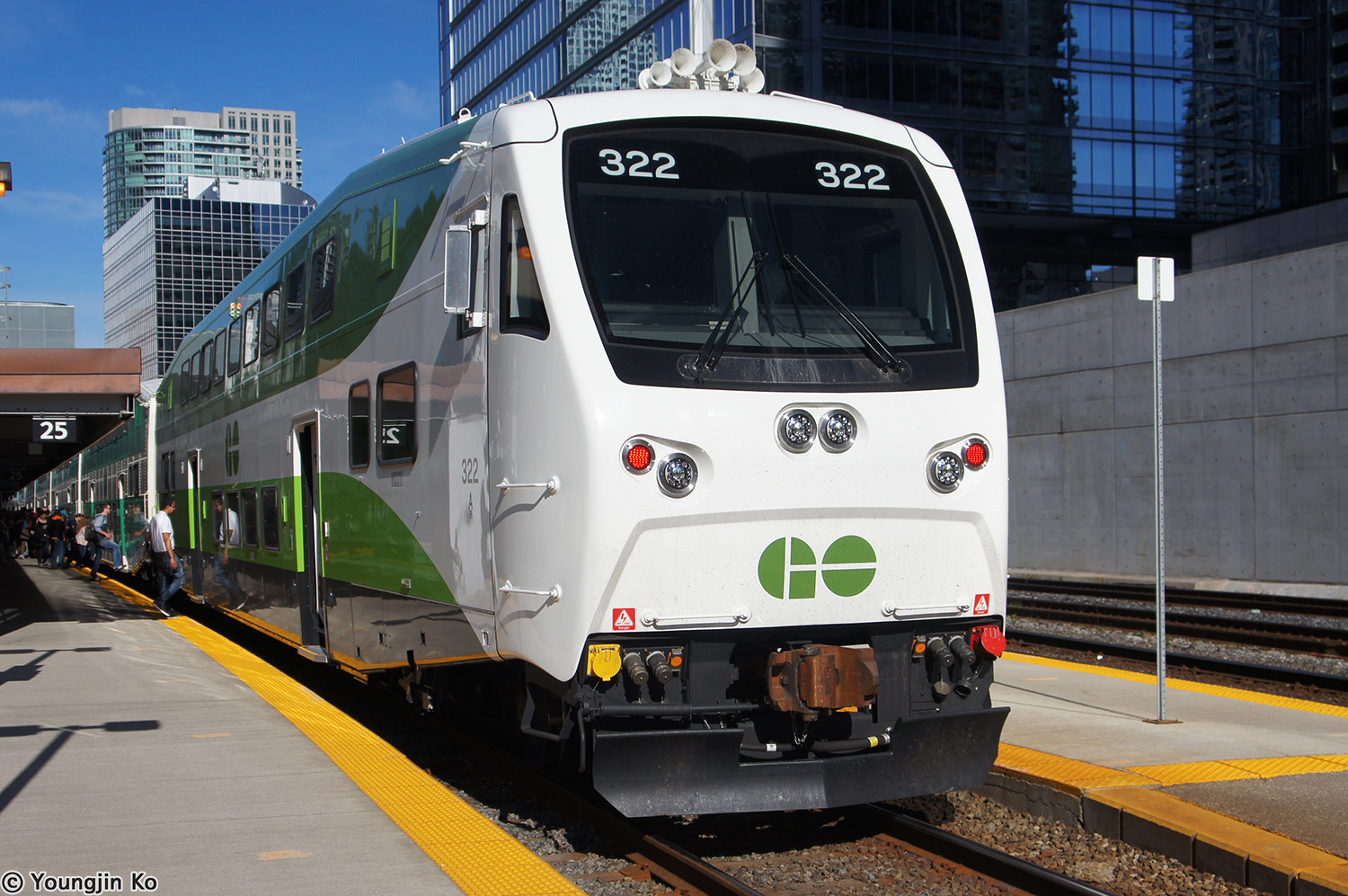
GO Transit serves the Greater Golden Horseshoe region surrounding Toronto. Its train services are transitioning from a peak direction commuter railway to a Regional Express Network.

Most commuter (or suburban) trains are built to main line rail standards, differing from light rail or rapid transit (metro rail) systems by:

- being larger
- providing more seating and less standing room, owing to the longer distances involved
- having (in most cases) a lower frequency of service
- having scheduled services (i.e., trains run at specific times rather than at specific intervals)
- serving lower-density suburban areas, typically connecting suburbs to the city center
- sharing track or right-of-way with intercity and/or freight trains
- not fully grade separated (containing at-grade crossings with crossing gates)
- being able to skip certain stations as an express service due to normally being driver-controlled

=== Train schedule ===
Compared to rapid transit (or metro rail), commuter/suburban rail often has lower frequency, following a schedule rather than running to a headway, and wider station spacing. Such services primarily serve lower-density suburban areas (outside the inner city), generally only having one or two stops in a city's central business district, and often share right-of-way with inter-city and freight trains. Often, service is concentrated in the peak, with fewer trains per hour running during the day; service late into the evening and on weekends may be reduced or not run at all. Average speeds are usually higher than rapid transit, often 50 km/h (31 mph) or higher. These higher speeds better serve the longer distances involved. Some suburban networks include skip-stop or express trains which serve only high-demand central, interchange and other major stations.

The general range of commuter trains' travel distance varies between 15 and 200 km (9.3 and 124.3 mi). Still, longer distances can be covered when trains run between two or more cities (e.g., the S-Bahn in the Ruhr area of Germany). Distances between stations may vary, but are usually much longer than those of urban rail systems. In the city center, the train may terminate, or run through the city center to serve suburbs on the other side before returning.

=== Track ===
Suburban trains' ability to coexist with freight or intercity services in the same right-of-way can drastically reduce system construction costs. However, as lines converge near the city center and the number of trains per hour increases, dedicated tracks may be built or existing tracks set aside for suburban trains only; commonly, two tracks of a quadruple-track line running through a city center are used for suburban services only.

Most such trains run on the local standard gauge track. Some systems may run on a narrower or broader gauge. Examples of narrow-gauge systems are found in Sweden, Austria, Switzerland, and on the Genoa-Casella line in Italy. Some countries and regions, such as San Francisco (BART) in the US and the Keikyu system in Japan, use wider track gauges than their national standards.

=== Distinction between other modes of rail ===
==== Metro ====
Metro rail and rapid transit usually cover smaller inner-urban areas within 12 to 20 km (7 to 12 mi) of city centers, with shorter stop spacing, use rolling stocks with larger standing spaces, lower top speed and higher acceleration, designed for short-distance travel. They also run more frequently, with headways rather than a published timetable, and use dedicated tracks (underground or elevated). In contrast, commuter rail often shares tracks, technology, and the legal framework within mainline railway systems, and uses rolling stocks with more seating and higher speed for comfort on longer city-suburban journeys.

However, classifying a line as metro or rapid rail can be difficult; many highly developed suburban networks run over dedicated rights-of-way in the city center and may primarily serve densely built-up inner suburbs. The fact that the terminology is not standardized across countries (even across English-speaking countries) further complicates matters. This distinction is most easily made when there are two (or more) systems such as New York's subway and the LIRR and Metro-North Railroad, Paris' Métro and RER along with Transilien, Washington D.C.'s Metro along with its MARC and VRE, London's tube lines of the Underground and the Overground, Elizabeth line, Thameslink along with other commuter rail operators, Madrid's Metro and Cercanías, Barcelona's Metro and Rodalies, and Tokyo's subway and the JR lines along with various privately owned and operated commuter rail systems.

==== Regional rail ====
Regional rail usually provides rail services between towns and cities, rather than solely linking major population hubs as inter-city rail does. Regional rail operates outside major cities. Unlike inter-city, it stops at most, if not all, stations between cities. It provides service to smaller communities along the line, which are often byproducts of ribbon development. Also, it connects to long-distance services at interchange stations located at junctions, terminals, or larger towns along the line. Alternative names are "local train" or "stopping train". Examples include the former BR's Regional Railways, France's TER (Transport express régional), Germany's Regionalexpress and Regionalbahn, and South Korea's Tonggeun and Mugunghwa-ho services.

==== Inter-city rail ====
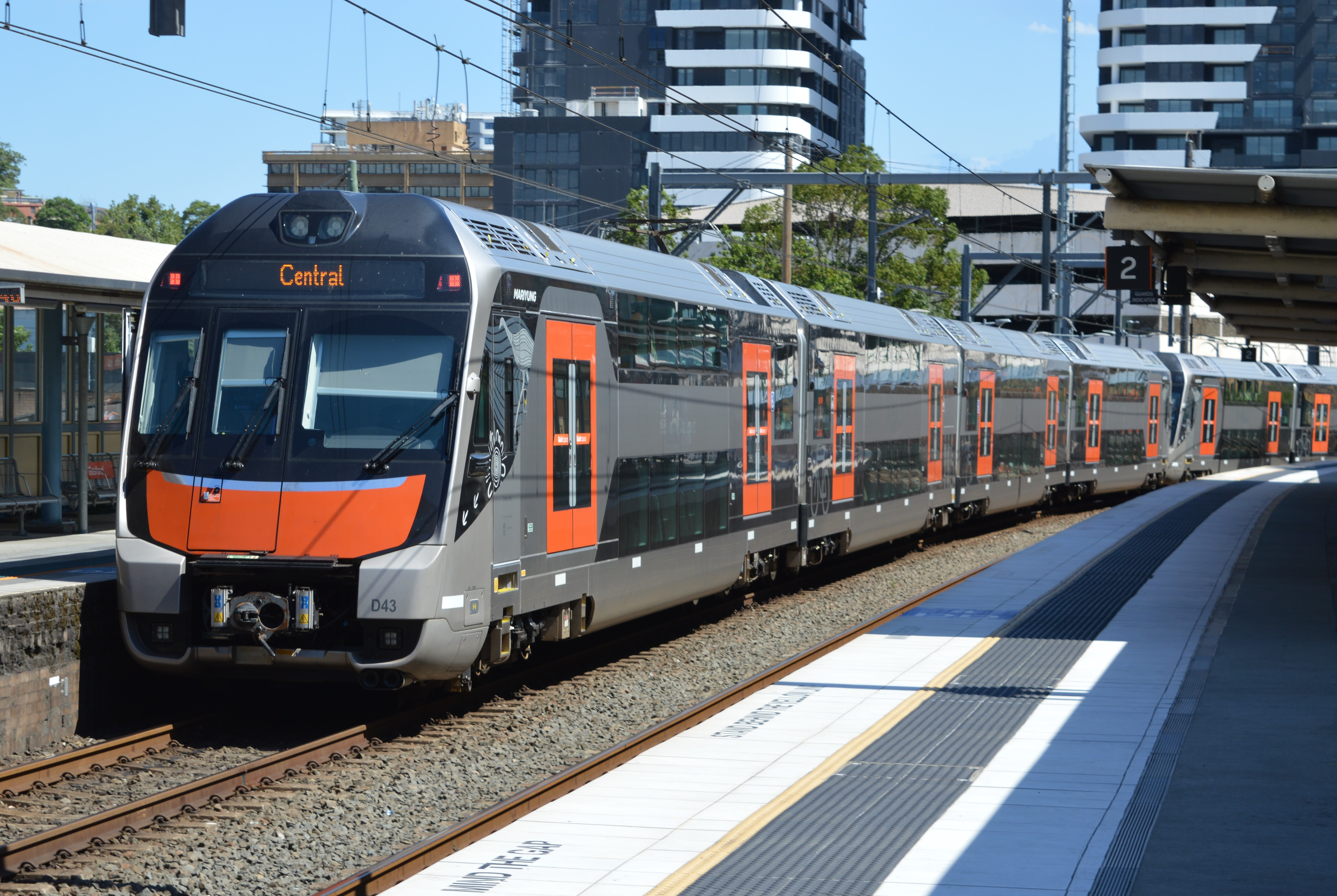
A New South Wales D set with an upper and lower deck

In some European countries, the distinction between commuter trains and long-distance/intercity trains is subtle, due to the relatively short distances involved. For example, Nederlandse Spoorwegen runs more than 80 direct trains a day over some 50 km between Amsterdam and The Hague, used daily by numerous commuters, despite notionally being an intercity route (albeit one within the Randstad conurbation). Likewise, many suburban services in the Greater Tokyo Area in Japan connect downtown Tokyo with cities which are substantial in their own right, such as Yokohama (population 3.7 million), Saitama (1.3 million), and Chiba (983,000) but are less than 50 km from the centre of Tokyo.

The United Kingdom has a largely privatized rail system (though it is in the process of renationalization), with different routes and services covered by different private operators. The distinction between commuter and intercity rail is not as clear as it was before privatization (when InterCity existed as a brand in its own right). However, usually it is still possible to tell them apart. Some operators, for example Thameslink, focus solely on commuter services. Others, such as Avanti West Coast and LNER, run solely intercity services. Others still, such as GWR and EMR, run a mixture of commuter, regional, and intercity services. Some of these operators use different branding for different types of service (for example, EMR brands its trains as either "InterCity", "Connect" for London commuter services, and "Regional"), but even for those operators that do not, the type of train, amenities offered, and stopping pattern usually tell the services apart.

Russian commuter trains, on the other hand, frequently cover areas larger than Belgium, although these are still short distances by Russian standards. They have a different ticketing system from long-distance trains, and in major cities, they often operate from a separate section of the train station.

Some consider "inter-city" service to be an express service operating between two main city stations, bypassing intermediate stations. However, this term is used in Australia (Sydney, for example) to describe the regional trains operating beyond the boundaries of the suburban services, even though some of these "inter-city" services stop at all stations, similar to German regional services. In this regard, the German service delineations and naming conventions are clearer and better used for academic purposes.

==== High-speed rail ====
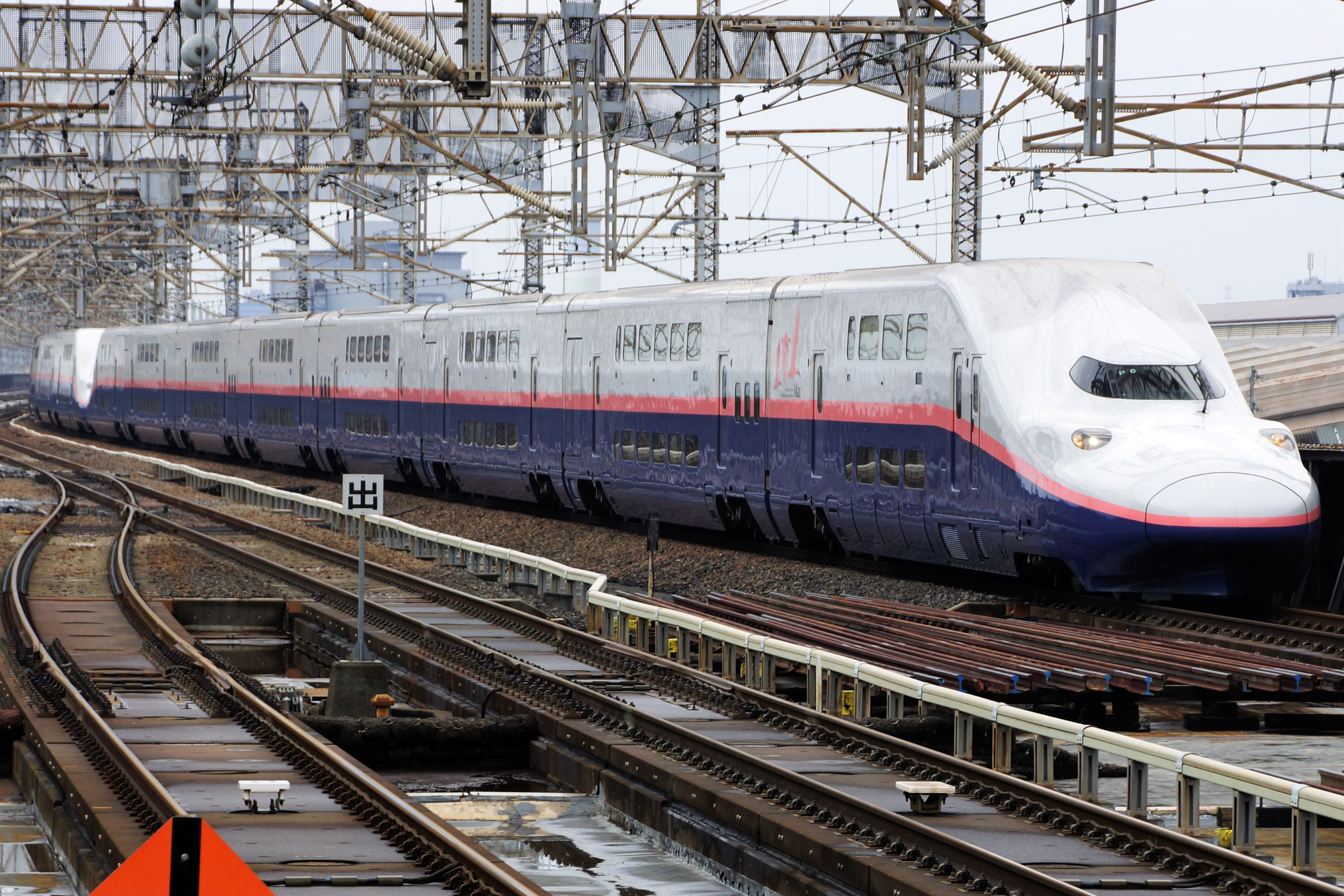
A Tokyo-bound E4 Series Shinkansen train. As of October 2021, these have since been retired.

Sometimes, high-speed rail can serve commuters' daily needs. The Japanese Shinkansen high speed rail system is heavily used by commuters in the Greater Tokyo Area, who commute between 100 and 200 km (62 and 124 mi) by Shinkansen. To meet the demand of commuters, JR sells commuter discount passes. Before 2021, they operated 16-car bilevel E4 Series Shinkansen trains at rush hour, providing a capacity of 1,600 seats. Several lines in China, such as the Beijing–Tianjin Intercity Railway and the Shanghai–Nanjing High-Speed Railway, serve a similar role with many more under construction or planned.

In South Korea, some sections of the high-speed rail network are also heavily used by commuters, such as the section between Gwangmyeong Station and Seoul Station on the KTX network (Gyeongbu HSR Line), or the section between Dongtan Station and Suseo Station on the SRT Line.

The high-speed services linking Zürich, Bern, and Basel in Switzerland (200 km/h (120 mph)) have brought the Central Business Districts (CBDs) of these three cities within 1 hour of each other. This has resulted in unexpectedly high demand for new commuter trips between the three cities and a corresponding increase in suburban rail passengers accessing the high-speed services at the main city-center stations (Hauptbahnhof). The Regional-Express commuter service between Munich and Nuremberg in Germany runs at 200 km/h (120 mph) on the 300 km/h (186 mph) Nuremberg–Ingolstadt high-speed railway.

The regional trains Stockholm–Uppsala, Stockholm–Västerås, Stockholm–Eskilstuna and Gothenburg–Trollhättan in Sweden reach 200 km/h (120 mph) and have many daily commuters.

In Great Britain, the HS1 domestic services between London and Ashford run at a top speed of 225 km/h, and in peak hours the trains can be full with commuters standing.

The Athens Suburban Railway in Greece consists of five lines, 4 of which are electrified. The Kiato–Piraeus line and the Aigio–Airport lines reach speeds of up to 180 km/h (112 mph). The Athens–Chalcis line is also expected to attain speeds of up to 200 km/h (124 mph) upon upgrading of the SKA–Oinoi railway sector. These lines also serve many daily commuters, with the number expected to rise further upon the full completion of the Acharnes Railway Center.

The Eskişehir-Ankara and Konya-Ankara high-speed train routes serve as commuter lines in Turkey.

== Train types ==
Commuter/suburban trains are usually optimized for maximum passenger volume, in most cases without sacrificing too much comfort and luggage space. However, they seldom have all the amenities of long-distance trains. Cars may be single- or double-level, and aim to provide seating for all. Compared to intercity trains, they have less space, fewer amenities, and limited baggage areas.

=== Multiple unit type ===
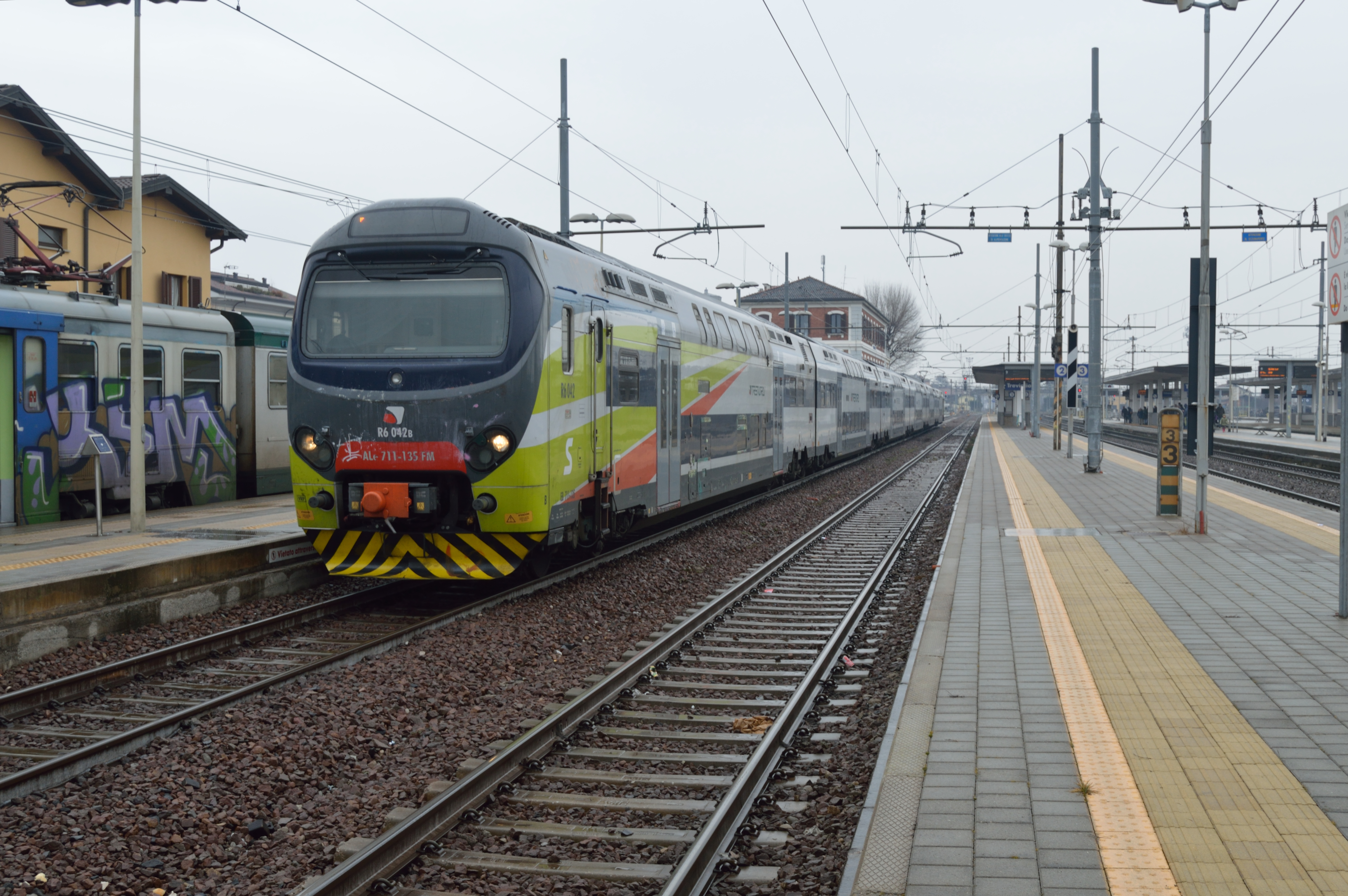
An electric multiple unit at Treviglio, on Milan suburban line S5

Commuter rail trains are usually composed of multiple units, which are self-propelled, bidirectional, articulated passenger rail cars with driving motors on each (or every other) bogie. Depending on local circumstances and tradition, they may be powered either by diesel engines located below the passenger compartment (diesel multiple units) or by electricity picked up from third rails or overhead lines (electric multiple units). Multiple units are almost invariably equipped with control cabs at both ends, which is why they are so frequently used to provide commuter services, owing to the associated short turnaround time.

=== Locomotive hauled services ===
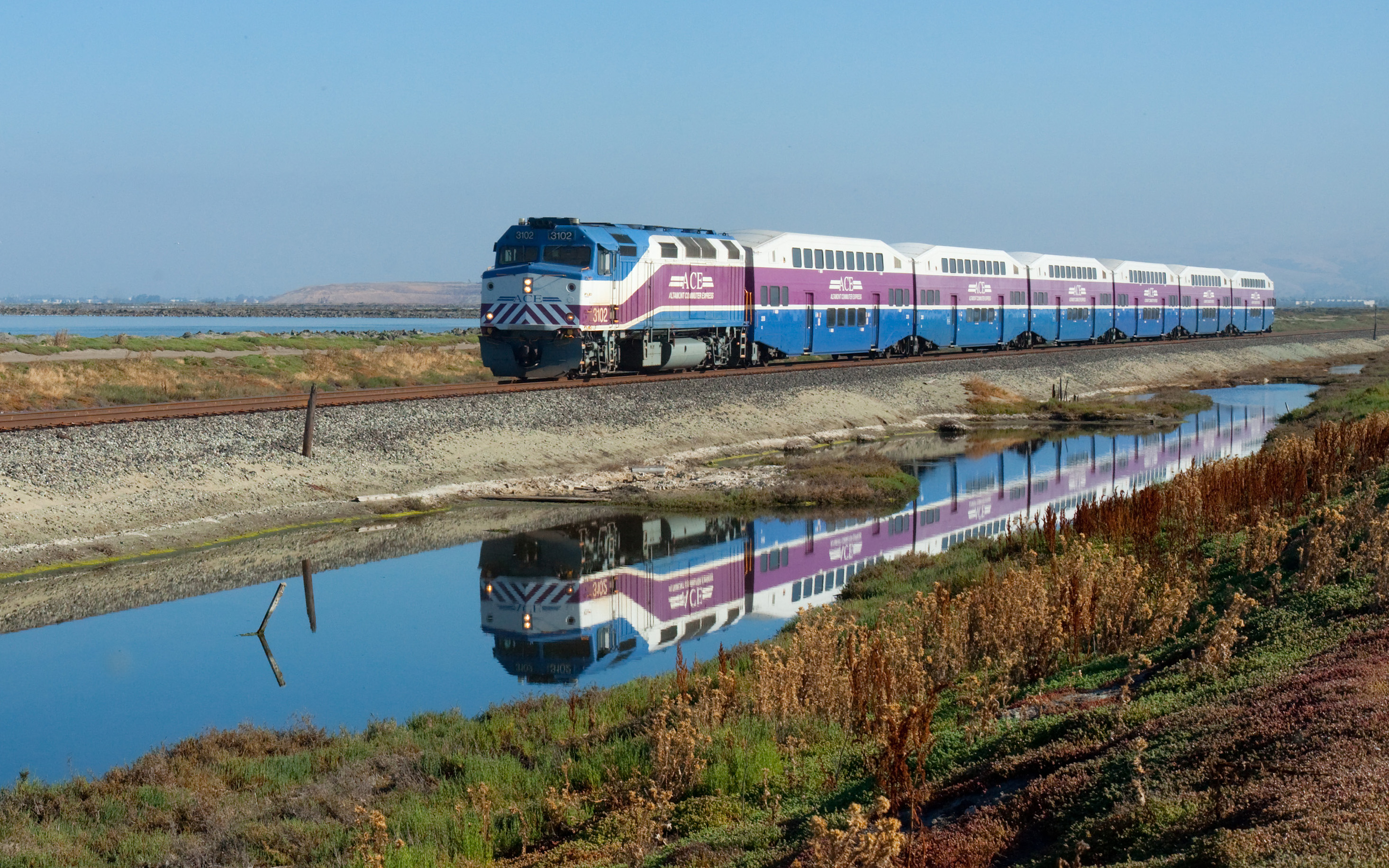
An Altamont Corridor Express train operating along the San Francisco Bay; a MPI F40PH-2C locomotive hauls a consist of Bombardier BiLevel Coaches.

Locomotive-hauled services are used in some countries or locations. This is often a case of asset-sweating, using a single large combined fleet for intercity and regional services. Loco-hauled services are usually run in push-pull formation, that is, the train can run with the locomotive at the "front" or "rear" (pushing or pulling). Push-pull trains are often equipped with a control car at the end of the train, allowing the train operator to control the train from either end. The motive power for locomotive-hauled commuter trains may be either electric or diesel–electric, although some countries, such as Germany and some of the former Soviet-bloc countries, also use diesel–hydraulic locomotives.

=== Seat plans ===
In the US and some other countries, a three-and-two seat plan is used. Middle seats on these trains are often less popular because passengers feel crowded and uncomfortable.

In Japan, South Korea, and Indonesia, longitudinal (sideways window-lining) seating is widely used on many commuter trains to increase capacity during rush hours. Carriages are usually not organized to increase seating capacity (although in some trains at least one carriage would feature more doors to facilitate easier boarding and alighting and bench seats so that they can be folded up during rush hour to provide more standing room) even in the case of commuting longer than 50 km and commuters in the Greater Tokyo Area, Seoul metropolitan area, and Jabodetabek area have to stand in the train for more than an hour.

== Commuter rail systems around the world ==
=== Africa ===
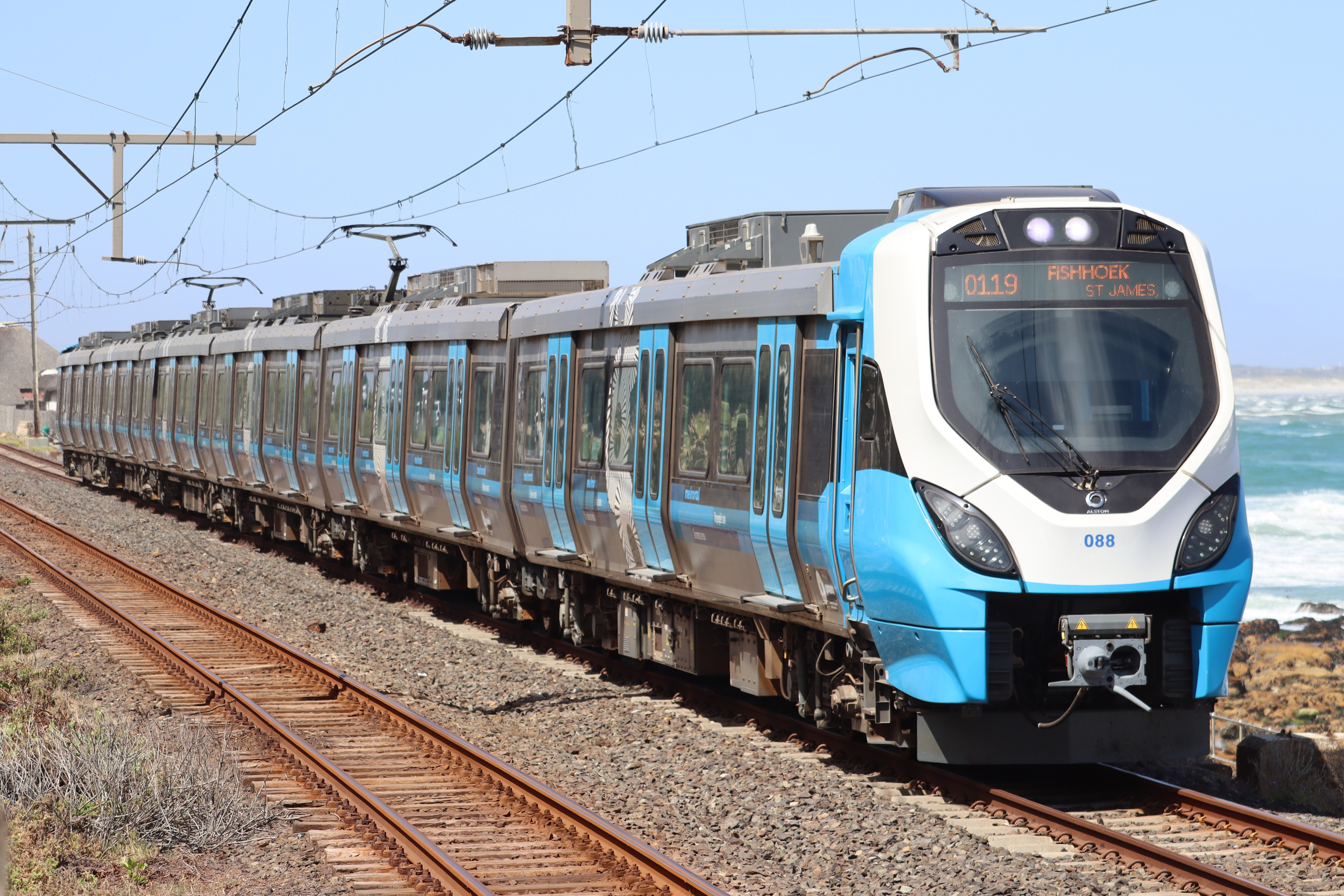
A Metrorail train pulling out to Fish Hoek station in Cape Town

Currently, there are few examples of commuter rail in Africa. Metrorail operates in the major cities of South Africa, and there are some commuter rail services in Algeria, Botswana, Kenya, Morocco, Egypt and Tunisia. In Algeria, the Algiers suburban rail network serves the capital Algiers and its southern and eastern suburbs. It also connects Algiers' main universities. The Dar es Salaam commuter rail offers intracity services in Dar es Salaam, Tanzania. In Botswana, the (Botswana Railways) "BR Express" has a commuter train between Lobatse and Gaborone.

=== Asia ===
==== East Asia ====
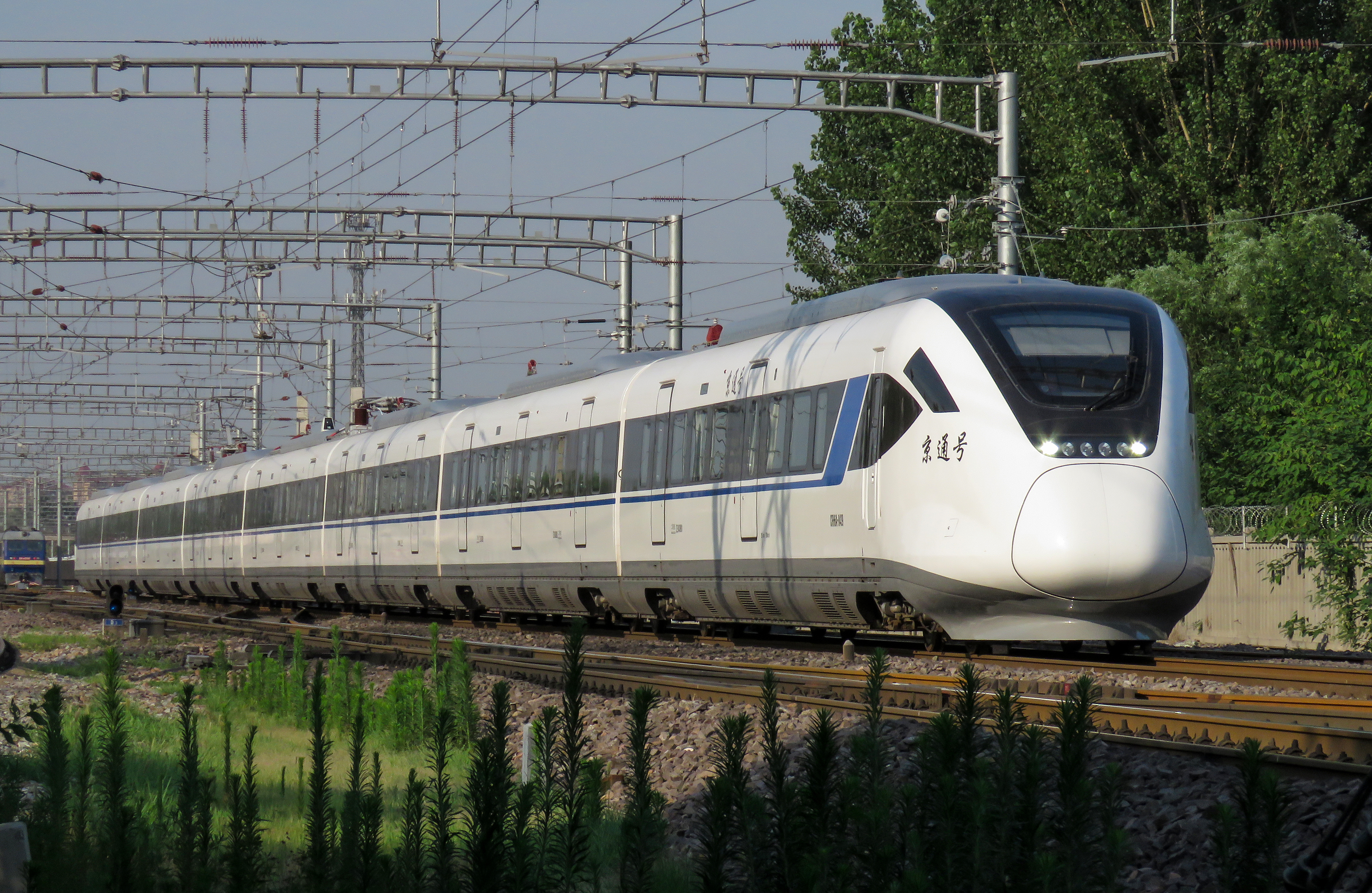
An CRH6 train operating a through service on the Beijing Suburban Railway Sub-Center line in China.

In Japan, commuter rail systems have extensive networks, frequent service, and high ridership. In many cases, Japanese commuter rail is operationally more like a typical metro system (frequent trains, an emphasis on standing passengers, short station spacings) than it is like commuter rail in other countries. Japanese commuter rail commonly interlines with city-center subway lines, with commuter trains continuing into the subway network and then out onto other commuter rail systems on the city's other side. Many Japanese commuter systems operate various stopping patterns to reduce travel time to distant destinations, often using station passing loops instead of dedicated express tracks. Notably, the larger Japanese commuter rail systems are owned and operated by for-profit private railway companies, without public subsidy.

East Japan Railway Company operates a large suburban train network in Tokyo with various lines connecting the suburban areas to the city center. While the Yamanote Line, Keihin Tohoku Line, Chūō–Sōbu Line services are arguably more akin to rapid transit with frequent stops, simple stopping patterns, no branching services, and inner suburb service, other services along the Chūō Rapid Line, Sōbu Rapid Line/Yokosuka Line, Ueno–Tokyo Line, and Shōnan–Shinjuku Line are mid-distance services from suburban lines in the outer reaches of Greater Tokyo through a high frequency corridor though central Tokyo.

Other commuter rail routes in Japan include:

- Hanshin Namba Line and Kintetsu Namba Line have a busy east west underground section that allow trains from both Hanshin Electric Railway and Kintetsu Railway to access Namba, a major commercial center of Osaka, and service destinations east and west of Osaka.
- Osaka Metro Sakaisuji Line is a north-south line that allows Hankyu services from the Senri Line, Kyoto Main Line and Arashiyama Line to enter Osaka city center.
- JR West Tozai Line is an underground east-west corridor allowing trains from the Kobe Line, Takarazuka Line and Gakkentoshi Line to access Umeda in central Osaka.
- JR West Osaka Loop Line is a mostly elevated loop line that allows for services from the Yamatoji Line, Hanwa Line, and Sakurajima Line to loop around central Osaka.
- JR West Kobe Line/Kyoto Line is a four track corridor allowing Biwako Line, Kosei Line, Takarazuka Line, San'yō Main Line and Akō Line services to service Kyoto, Osaka and Kobe.
- Kōbe Rapid Transit Railway, a private railway, owns two underground corridors (a north-south and east-west line) that allow for Sanyo Electric Railway, Hankyu railway, Hanshin Electric Railway, and Kobe Electric Railway services to enter and cross Kobe city center.
- Most of the trains on the Meitetsu network operate on a high-frequency trunk line on the Meitetsu Nagoya Main Line, branching out to other lines on the other side of Nagoya.

Commuter rail systems have been inaugurated in several cities in China such as Beijing, Shanghai, Zhengzhou, Wuhan, Changsha and the Pearl River Delta. With plans for large systems in the northeastern Zhejiang, Jingjinji, and Yangtze River Delta areas. The level of service varies considerably from line to line, ranging from high to near high speeds. More developed and established lines, such as the Guangshen Railway, offer more frequent metro-like service.

The two MTR lines which are owned and formerly operated by the Kowloon-Canton Railway Corporation (East Rail line and Tuen Ma line which is integrated from the former West Rail line and Ma On Shan line in 2021), then the "KCR"), and MTR's own Tung Chung line connect the new towns in New Territories and the city centre Kowloon with frequent intervals, and some New Territories-bound trains terminate at intermediate stations, providing more frequent services in Kowloon and the towns closer to Kowloon. They use rolling stock with a higher maximum speed and have longer stop spacing than other lines, which only run in the inner urban area. Still, to maximize capacity and throughput, these rolling stocks have longitudinal seating, 5 pairs of doors in each carriage with large standing spaces like the urban lines, and run as frequently as well. Most of the four lines are overground, and some sections of the East Rail Line share tracks with intercity trains to mainland China. The three KCR lines have been integrated into the MTR network since 2008. Most passengers do not need to exit and re-enter the system through separate fare gates and purchase separate tickets to transfer between such lines and the rest of the network (the exceptions are between the Tuen Ma line's East Tsim Sha Tsui station and the Tsuen Wan line's Tsim Sha Tsui station.

In Taiwan, the Western line in the Taipei-Taoyuan Metropolitan Area, Taichung Metropolitan Area and Tainan-Kaohsiung Metropolitan Area as well as the Neiwan-Liujia line in the Hsinchu Area are considered commuter rail.

In South Korea, the Seoul Metropolitan Subway has 22 lines, some of which serve suburban areas. This is especially the case for lines operated by Korail, such as the Gyeongui-Jungang Line, the Gyeongchun Line, the Suin-Bundang Line, or the Gyeonggang Line. Some lines not operated by Korail, such as the AREX Line, the Seohae Line, or the Shinbundang Line, also primarily function as commuter rail. Lastly, even for the "numbered lines" (1–9) of the Seoul Metropolitan Subway which mostly travel in the dense parts of Seoul, some track sections extend far outside of the city, and operate large sections at ground level, such as on the Line 1, Line 3 and Line 4. In Busan, the Donghae Line, while part of the Busan Metro system, mostly functions as a commuter rail line.

==== Southeast Asia ====
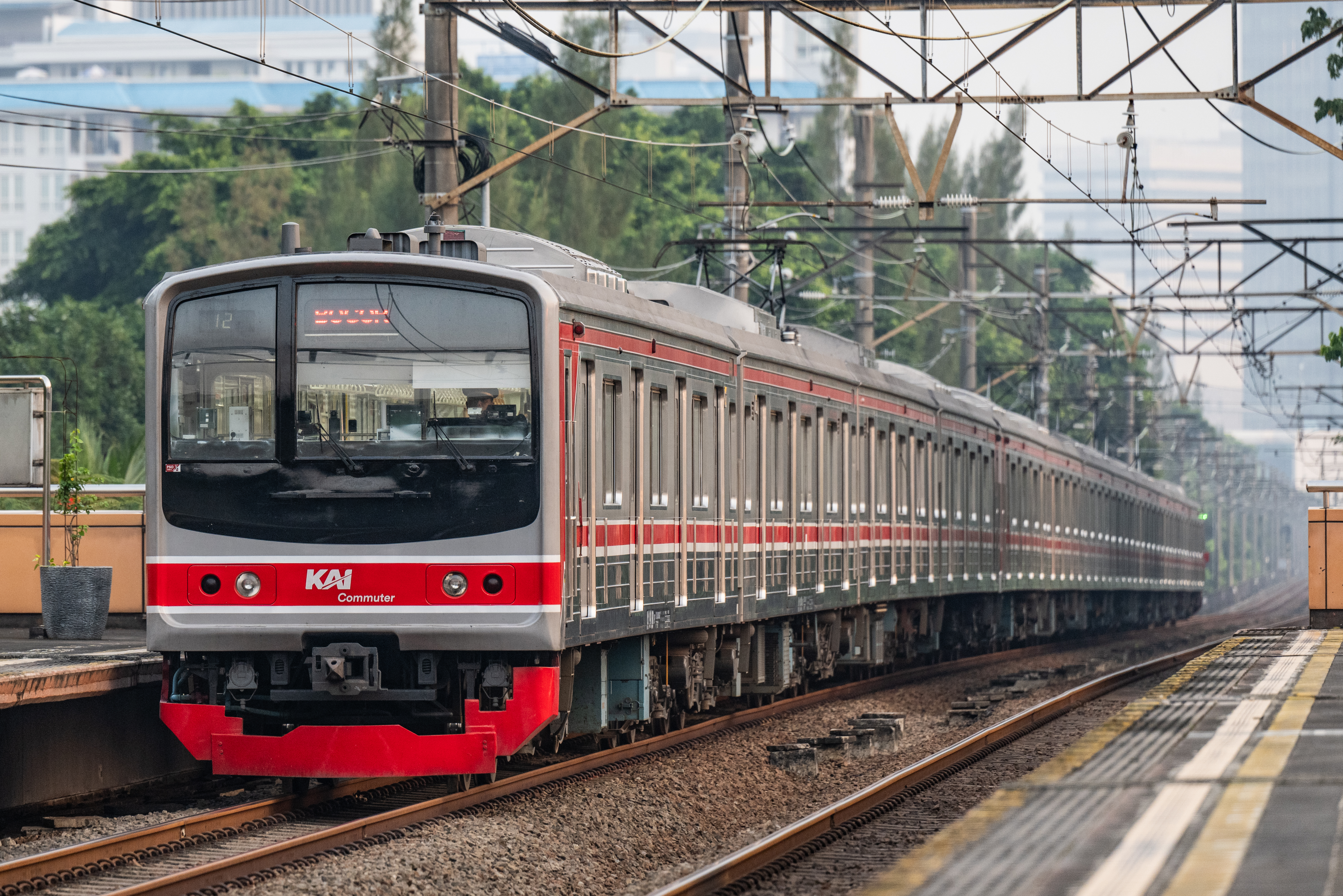
The KRL Commuterline set Seri 205 (Marchen face) serves the Bogor Line in Indonesia

In Indonesia, the KRL Commuterline is the largest commuter rail system in the country, serving the Greater Jakarta. It connects the Jakarta city center with surrounding cities and suburbs in Banten and West Java provinces, including Depok, Bogor, Tangerang, Serpong, Rangkasbitung, Bekasi and Cikarang. In July 2015, KRL Commuterline served more than 850,000 passengers per day, which is almost triple of the 2011 figures, but still less than 3.5% of all Jabodetabek commutes. Other commuter rail systems in Indonesia include the Metro Surabaya Commuter Line, Commuter Line Baraya, Yogyakarta–Solo Line, Kedung Sepur, and the Sri Lelawangsa.

In the Philippines, the Philippine National Railways currently operates two commuter rail systems: the PNR Metro Commuter Line in the Greater Manila Area and the PNR Bicol Commuter in the Bicol Region. A new commuter rail line in Metro Manila, the North–South Commuter Railway, is currently under construction, with completion targeted for 2031.

In Malaysia, there are three commuter services operated by Keretapi Tanah Melayu. They are the KTM Komuter that serves Kuala Lumpur and the surrounding Klang Valley area, the KTM Komuter Northern Sector that serves the George Town Conurbation, Perak, Kedah and Perlis in the northern region of Peninsular Malaysia and the KTM Komuter Southern Sector which operates within Johor.

In Thailand, the Greater Bangkok Commuter rail and the Airport Rail Link serve the Bangkok Metropolitan Region. The SRT Red Lines, a new commuter line in Bangkok, started construction in 2009. It opened in 2021.

Another commuter rail system in Southeast Asia is the Yangon Circular Railway in Myanmar.

==== South Asia ====
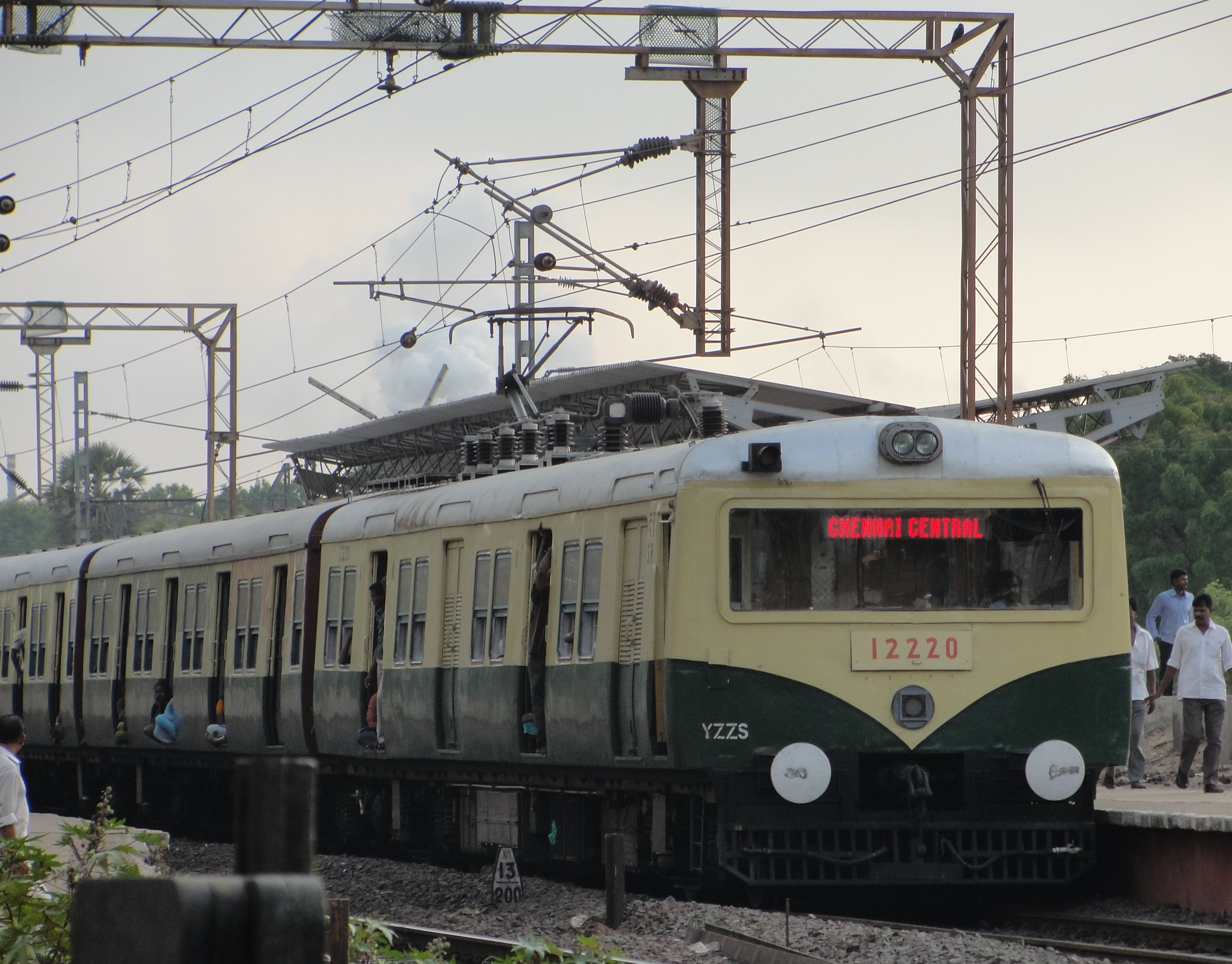
Chennai suburban railway

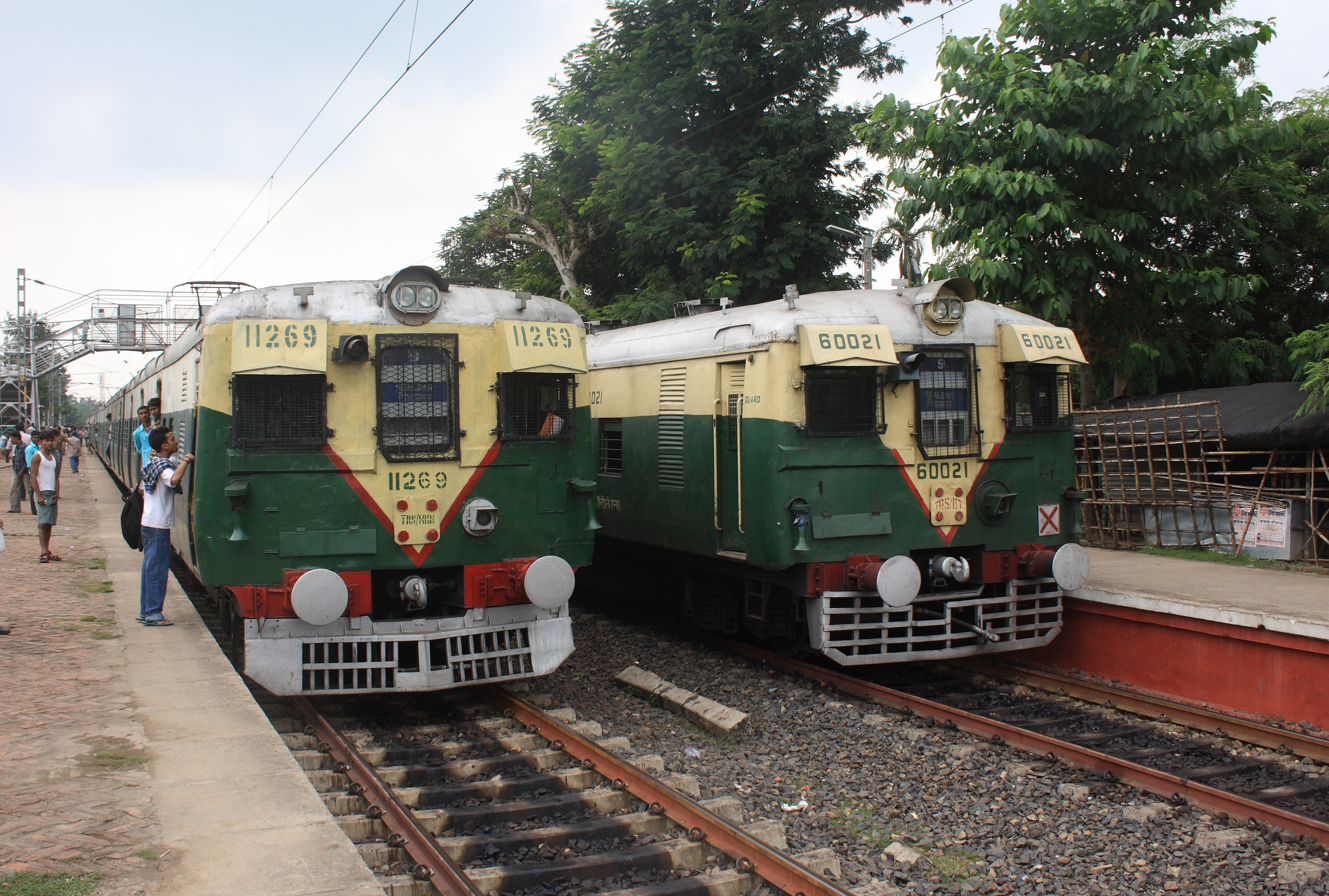
Kolkata Suburban Railway is the largest suburban railway network in India.

In India, commuter rail systems operate in major cities and their suburbs. Mumbai Suburban Railway, the oldest suburban rail system in Asia, carries more than 7.24 million commuters daily, accounting for more than half of Indian Railways' total daily passenger capacity. Kolkata Suburban Railway, one of the largest suburban railway networks in the world, consists of more than 450 stations and carries more than 3.5 million commuters per day. The Chennai Suburban Railway, along with the Chennai Mass Rapid Transit, also covers over 300 stations and carries more than 2.5 million people daily to different areas in Chennai and its surroundings. Other commuter railways in India include the Hyderabad Multi Modal Transport System, Delhi Suburban Railway, Pune Suburban Railway, and Lucknow-Kanpur Suburban Railway.

In 2020, the Government of India approved Bengaluru Suburban Railway to connect Bengaluru and its suburbs. The Bengaluru suburban railway is currently under construction. It will be unique and the first of its kind in India, featuring metro-like facilities and rolling stock.

In Bangladesh, there is one suburban rail called the Chittagong Circular Railway. Another suburban railway, the Dhaka Circular Railway, is currently under proposal.

Karachi in Pakistan has a circular railway since 1969. In Ahmedabad, the proposed Ahmedabad Suburban railway will connect the cities of Ahmedabad and Gandhinagar.

==== West Asia ====
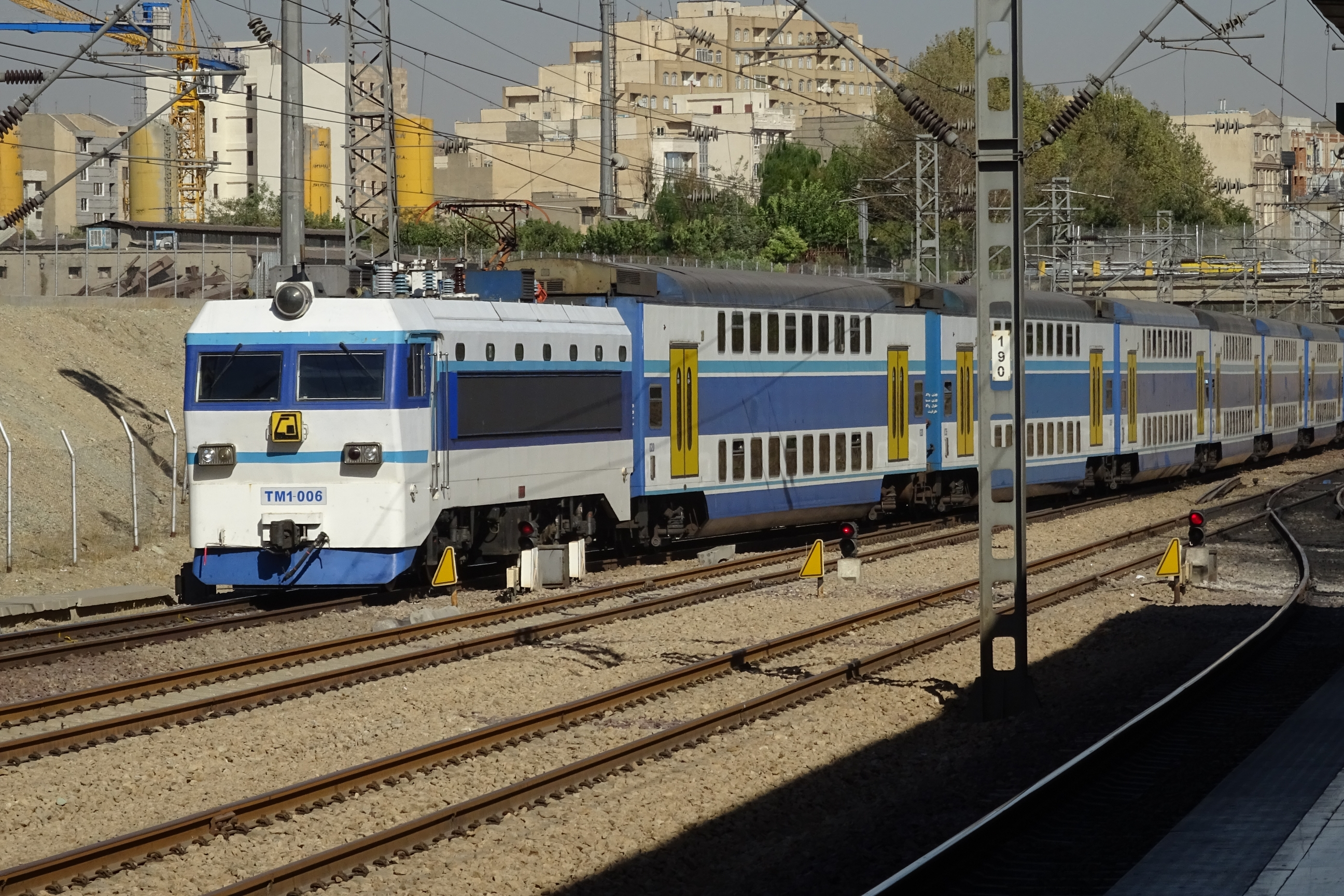
Tehran Metro with Line 5 only running the commuter rail

In Israel, the Israel Railways is the largest commuter rail system in the country, serving the North, Tel Aviv, Central, Jerusalem, and South. It connects the Jerusalem and Tel Aviv centers with surrounding cities and suburbs in their regions.

Tehran Metro currently operates the Line 5 commuter line between Tehran and Karaj.

Turkey has commuter rail in the cities of Ankara, Izmir, Istanbul and Gaziantep.

=== Europe ===
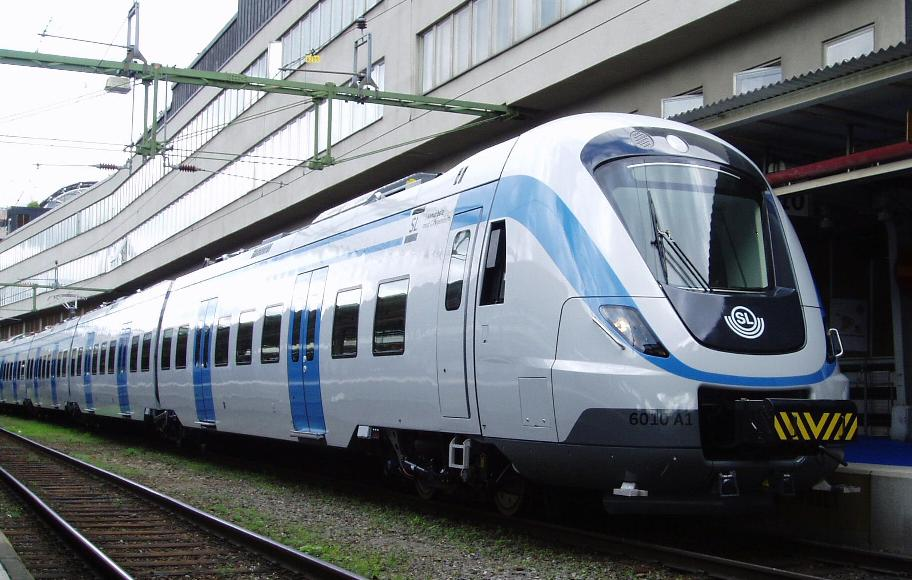
Type X60 at Stockholm Central in Sweden

Extensive commuter/suburban rail systems usually serve major metropolitan areas in most European countries. Well-known examples include BG Voz in Belgrade (Serbia), S-Bahn in Germany, Austria and German-speaking areas of Switzerland, Proastiakos in Greece, RER in France and Belgium, Servizio ferroviario suburbano in Italy, Cercanías and Rodalies (Catalonia) in Spain, CP Urban Services in Portugal, Esko in Prague and Ostrava (Czech Republic), HÉV in Budapest (Hungary) and DART in Dublin (Ireland).

==== Western Europe ====
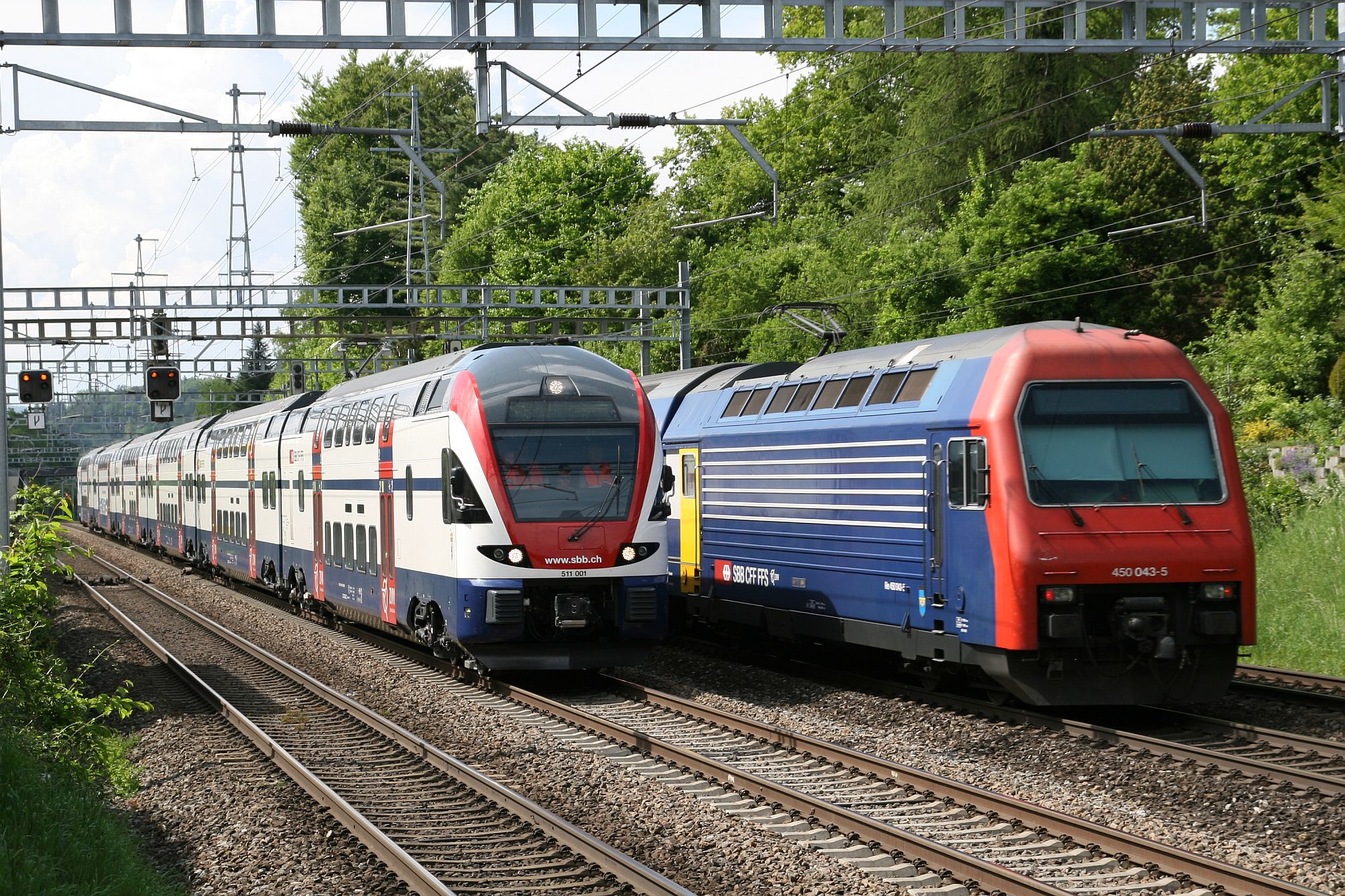
Stadler KISS and Re 450 hauled double-decker cars of Zürich S-Bahn

London has multiple commuter rail routes:

- The Elizabeth line runs on a 22-kilometre (14-mile) east–west twin tunnel under central London (Crossrail project) as its central core section.
- Thameslink brings together several branches from northern and southern suburbs and satellite towns into a high-frequency central tunnel underneath London.
- The London Overground, by contrast, skirts through the inner suburbs with lines mostly independent of each other, although there are several branches. The Watford DC line, partly shared with underground trains, uses a third rail, but parallels a main line using overhead wires. The East London line and North London line run at metro-like frequencies in inner London, making them nearly indistinguishable from metro systems, except that the tracks are shared with freight trains.
- The Metropolitan line, despite being part of the London Underground, is a commuter rail route as it links the City of London to commuter towns outside Greater London such as Rickmansworth, Amersham and Chesham, where it runs to a timetable, being the only London Underground line with a public timetable published. It also shares tracks with Chiltern Railways main line services between London and Aylesbury.

The Merseyrail network in Liverpool consists of two commuter rail routes powered by third rail, both of which branch out at one end. At the other, the Northern line continues out of the city centre to a mainline rail interchange, while the Wirral line has a city-centre loop.

Birmingham has four suburban routes that operate from Birmingham New Street & Birmingham Moor Street stations, one of which uses diesel trains.

The Tyneside Electrics system in Newcastle upon Tyne operated from 1904 to 1967, using a DC third rail. British Rail did not have the budget to maintain the aging electrification system. The Riverside Branch was closed, while the remaining lines were de-electrified. 13 years later, they were re-electrified using DC overhead wires, and now form the Tyne & Wear Metro Yellow Line.

Many of the rail services around Glasgow are branded as Strathclyde Partnership for Transport. The network includes most electrified Scottish rail routes.

The West Yorkshire Passenger Transport Executive operates 11 services that feed into Leeds, connecting the city with commuter areas and neighboring urban centers within the West Yorkshire Built-up Area.

MetroWest is a proposed network in Bristol, northern Somerset & southern Gloucestershire. The four-tracking of the line between Bristol Temple Meads and Bristol Parkway stations will enable local rail services to be separated from long-distance trains.

The Réseau express régional d'Île-de-France (RER) is a commuter rail network in the Paris agglomeration. In the center, the RER has high-frequency underground corridors where several suburban branches feed, similar to a rapid transit system.

Commuter rail systems in German-speaking regions are called S-Bahn. While in some major cities S-Bahn services run exclusively on separate lines, other systems use existing regional rail tracks.

Randstadspoor is a network of Sprinter train services in and around the city of Utrecht in the Netherlands. To realize this network, new stations were opened. Separate tracks have been built for these trains, so they can call frequently without disturbing high-frequency Intercity services parallel to these routes. Similar systems are planned for The Hague and Rotterdam.

==== Northern Europe ====
In Sweden, electrified commuter rail systems known as Pendeltåg are present in the cities of Stockholm and Gothenburg. The Stockholm commuter rail system, which began in 1968, shares railway tracks with intercity and freight trains but, for the most part, runs on its own dedicated tracks. It is primarily used to transport passengers from nearby towns and other suburban areas into the city center, not for transportation inside the city center. The Gothenburg commuter rail system, which began in 1960, is similar to the Stockholm system, but does fully share tracks with long-distance trains.

In Norway, the Oslo commuter rail system has been more limited since 2022, but the remaining commuter lines run on tracks mostly unused by other trains. From 2022, several lines with an hourly frequency and travel times to endpoints of over 1 hour are reclassified as regional trains. Before 2022, Oslo had the largest commuter rail system in the Nordic countries by line length and number of stations. Also, Bergen, Stavanger, and Trondheim have commuter rail systems. These have only one or two lines each, and they share tracks with other trains.

In Finland, the Helsinki commuter rail network runs on dedicated tracks from Helsinki Central railway station to Leppävaara and Kerava. The Ring Rail Line serves Helsinki Airport and the northern suburbs of Vantaa and is exclusively used by the commuter rail network. On 15 December 2019, the Tampere region got its own commuter rail service, with trains running from Tampere to Nokia, Lempäälä, and Orivesi.

==== Southern Europe ====
In Spain, Cercanías networks exist in Madrid, Sevilla, Murcia/Alicante, San Sebastián, Cádiz, León, Ferrol, Valencia, Asturias, Santander, Zaragoza, Bilbao and Málaga. All these systems include underground sections in the city center.

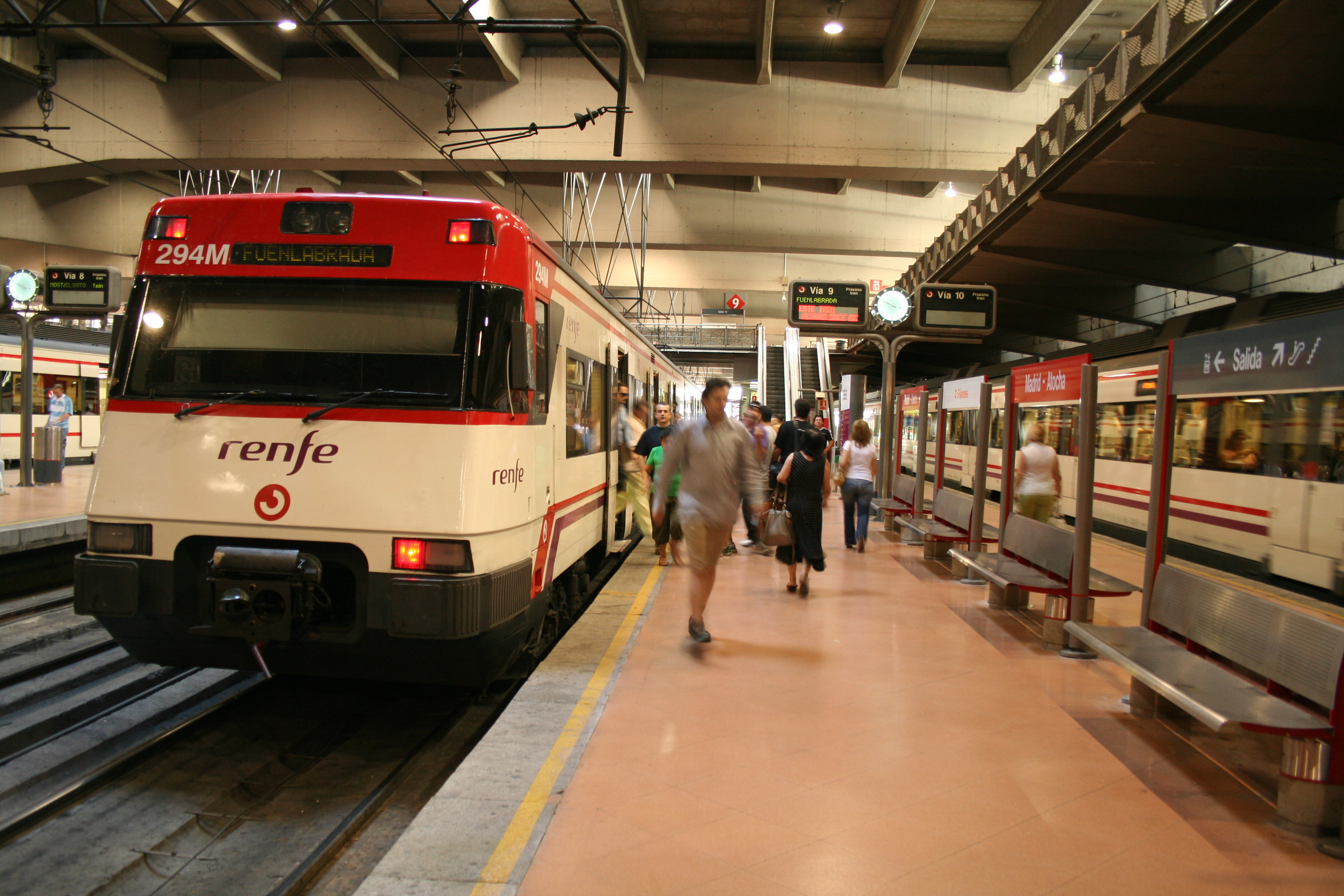
Atocha is the main station in Spain mainly due to the Cercanías.

Cercanías Madrid is one of the most important train services in the country; more than 900,000 passengers move in the system. It has underground stations in Madrid like Recoletos, Sol, or Nuevos Ministerios and in the metropolitan area in cities like Parla or Getafe.

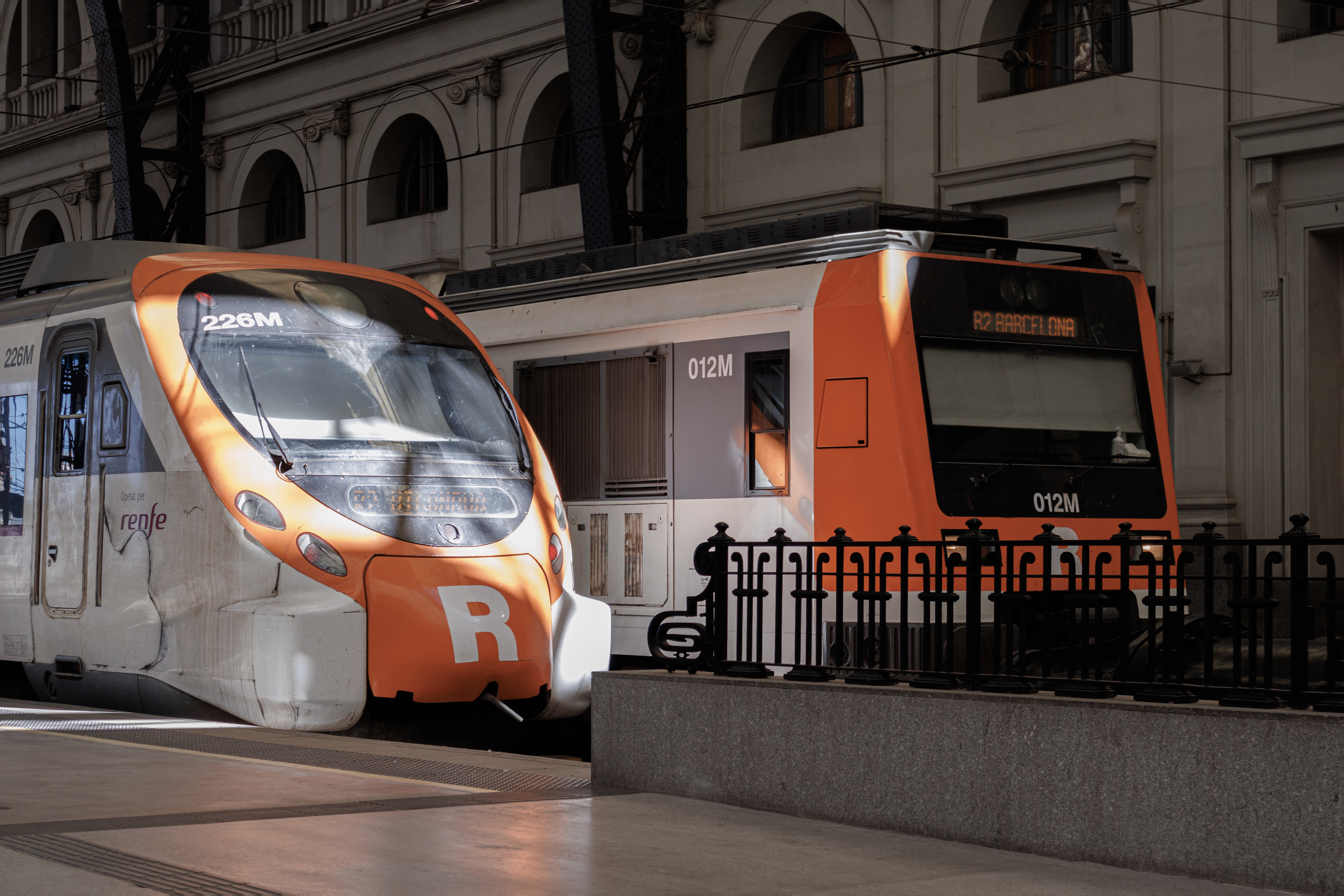
Rodalies Renfe trains in Estació de França, Barcelona

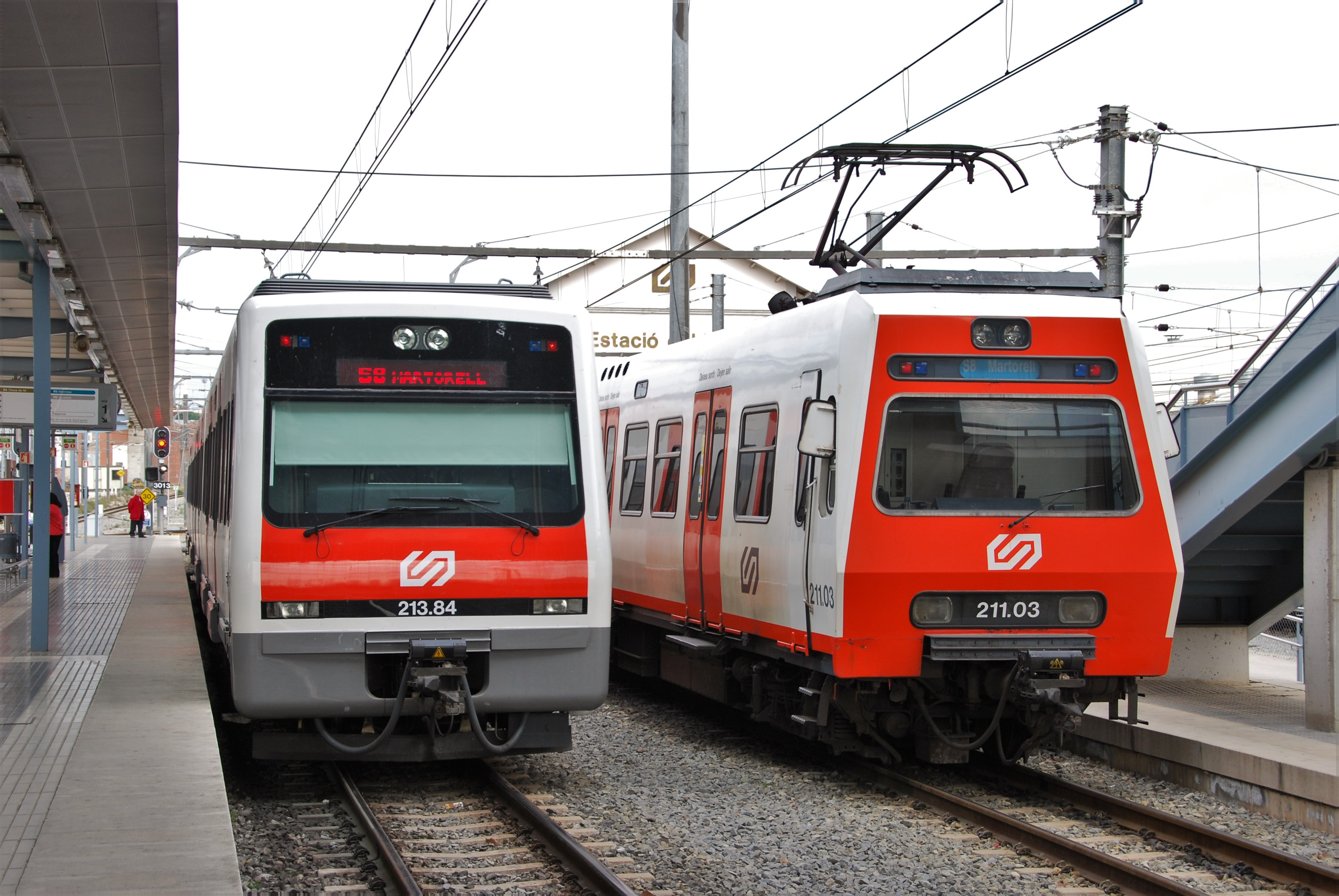
Trains in circulation on the FGC Llobregat-Anoia line in 2009

In the autonomous community of Catalonia, and unlike the rest of Spain, the commuter service is not managed by Renfe Operadora. Since 2010, the Government of Catalonia has managed all the regular commuter services with the "transfer of Rodalies". There are two companies that manage the Catalan commuter network:

- Rodalies de Catalunya, which after the transfer at the beginning of 2010 when, due to the "Catalan rail chaos" of 2007, the Spanish government promised to transfer the Renfe commuter service to the Generalitat, although it does not deal with the entire service; After the transfer, responsibilities for the commuter trains were divided into three parts: the Generalitat (management, regulation, planning, coordination and inspection of services and activities and power to charge), Renfe (train operator and its maintenance), and Adif (owner of the railway infrastructure). Lines R1, R2, R2 Nord, R2 Sud, R3 (to Sant Quirze de Besora, from there to Puigcerdà or La Tor de Querol it is considered a regional route), R4, R7 and R8 run through Rodalies de Catalunya, all on Iberian gauge (1668 mm).
- Ferrocarrils de la Generalitat de Catalunya (FGC) is the railway company responsible for the Vallès, Llobregat-Anoia and Lleida-La Pobla de Segur lines. This company is mainly in charge of metro and suburban lines, although it also has five commuter lines spread over two lines, four on the Llobregat-Anoia line (R5, R50, R6, R60) on metre-gauge (1000 mm) and a single line on the Lleida-La Pobla de Segur line (RL1) on Iberian gauge (1668 mm). FGC is in charge of the entire service, unlike Rodalies de Catalunya, which is not in charge of either the trains or the infrastructure.

Since 2024, the Government of Catalonia has full control of the current R12 regional line; it is now owned by the FGC. It will eliminate the current line and replace it with the new commuter lines RL3 and RL4, towards Cervera and Manresa from Lleida respectively.

In the Basque Country region, there also exists a differentiated regional operator called Euskotren. Among the lines they run, the Txorierri line (E3), as well as the Topo (E2 and E5) all operate as commuter rail, connecting suburban areas north of Bilbao to the city in the case of the former, and connecting different areas of the San Sebastián metropolitan area in the case of the latter.

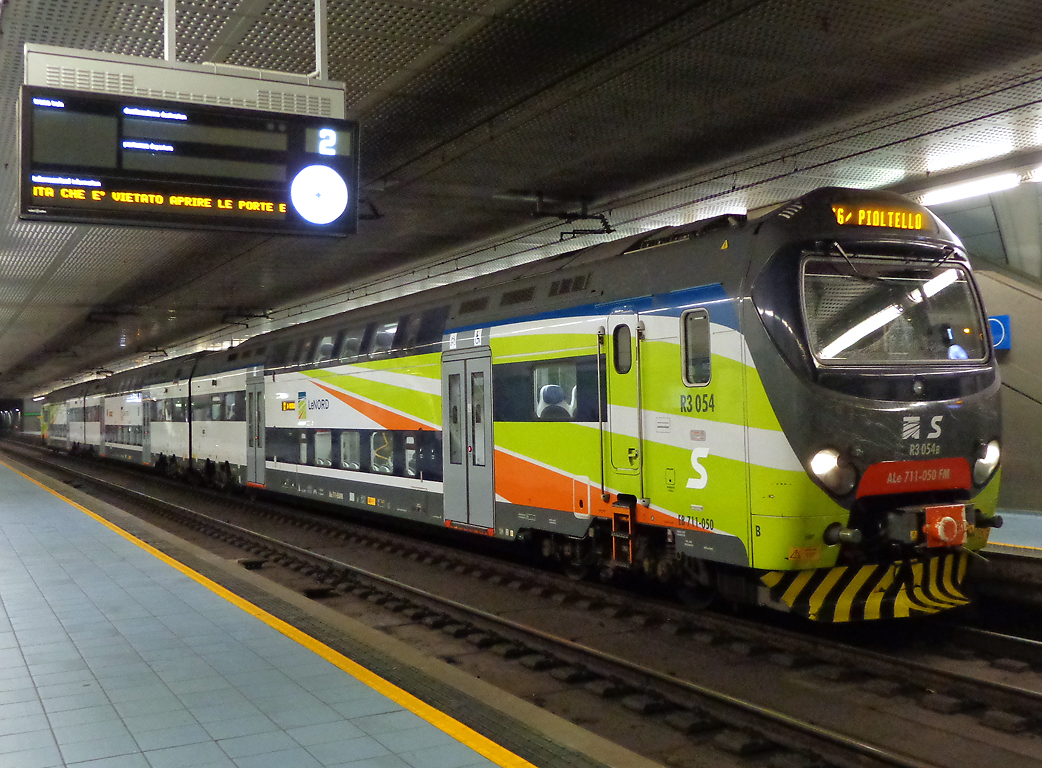
A TSR train at Milano Porta Venezia railway station on the Milan Passerby railway, Italy

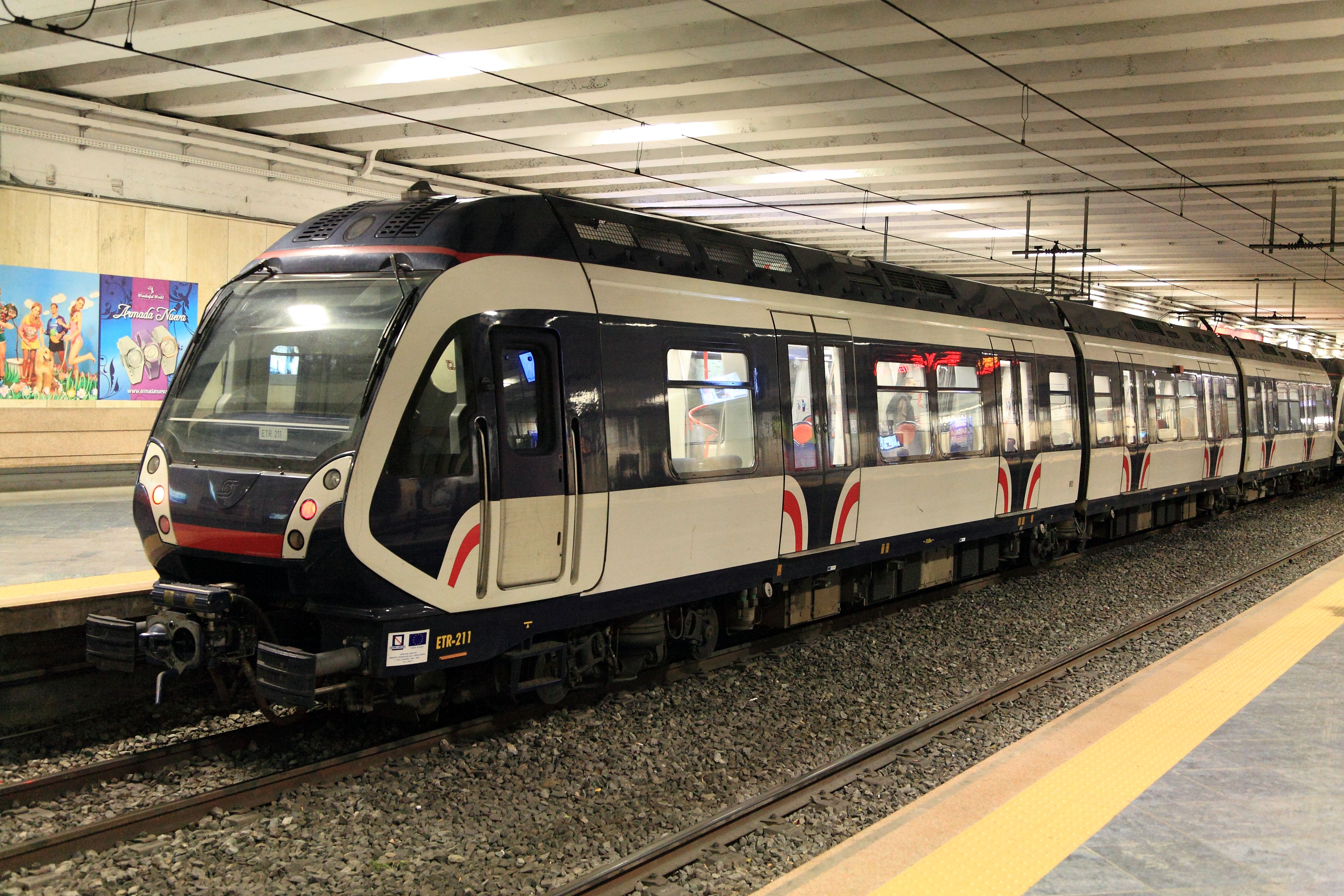
A Metrostar train at Napoli Garibaldi railway station on the Circumvesuviana railway network

In Italy, fifteen cities have commuter rail systems:

- Bari (Bari metropolitan railway service, 3 lines)
- Bologna (Bologna metropolitan railway service, 8 lines)
- Cagliari, 1 line
- Catanzaro, 2 lines
- Genoa (Genoa urban railway service, 3 lines)
- Messina, 1 line
- Milan (Milan suburban railway service, 13 lines)
- Naples, 8 lines
- Palermo (Palermo metropolitan railway service, 2 lines)
- Perugia, 1 line
- Potenza, 1 line
- Reggio Calabria, 1 line
- Rome (FL lines, 8 lines)
- Salerno (Salerno metropolitan railway service, 1 line)
- Turin (Turin metropolitan railway service, 8 lines)
- Treni Regionali Ticino Lombardia connects Canton Ticino, Switzerland, and Italy, reaching Lombard cities like Como and Varese and the Milan Malpensa Airport.

==== Eastern Europe ====
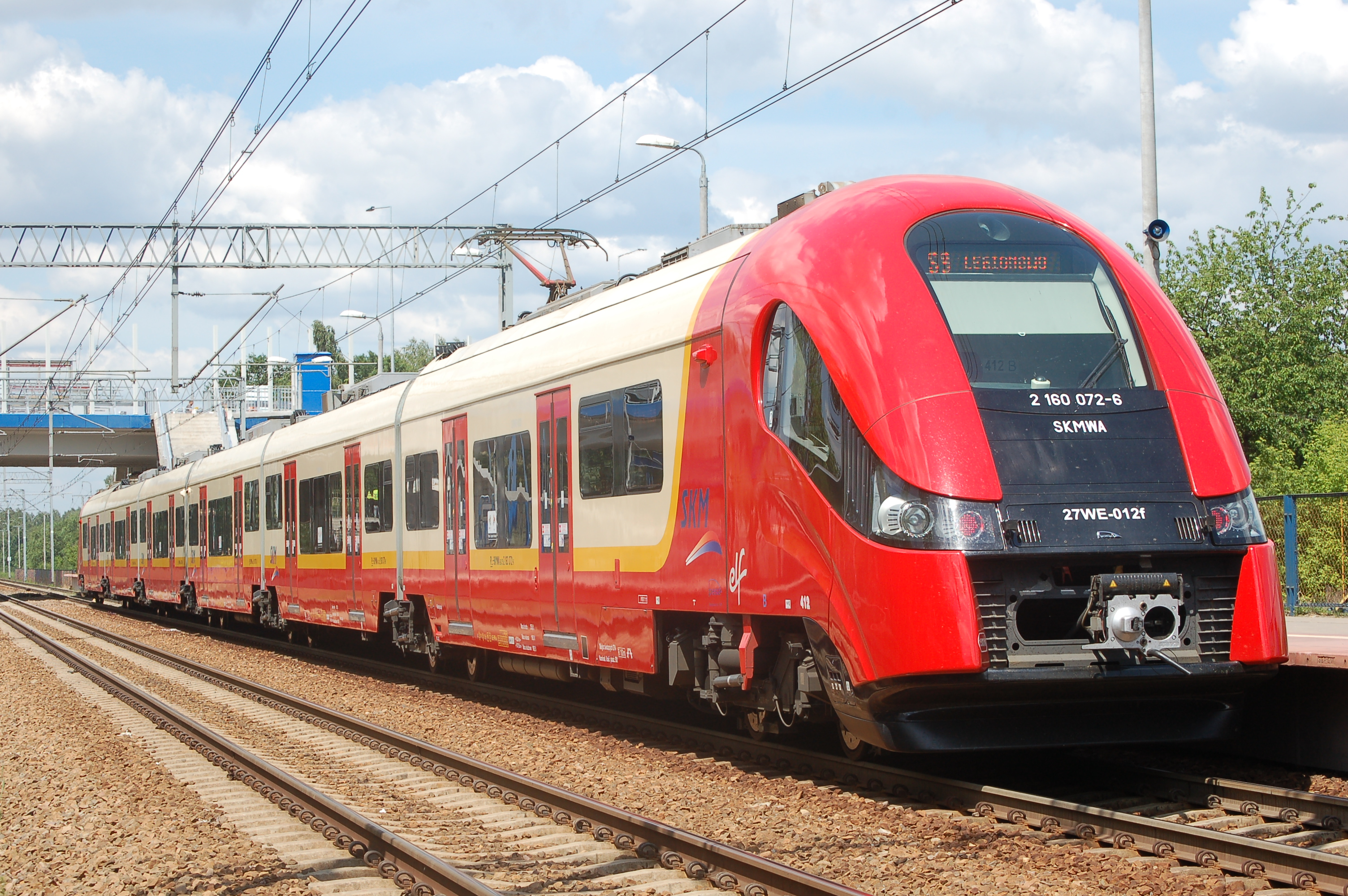
SKM train in Warsaw, Poland

In Poland, commuter rail systems exist in Tricity, Warsaw, Kraków (SKA) and Katowice (SKR). There is also a similar system planned in Wrocław and Szczecin. The terms used are "Szybka Kolej Miejska" (fast urban rail) and "kolej aglomeracyjna" (agglomeration rail). These systems are:

- Szybka Kolej Miejska w Warszawie in the Warsaw urban area, with 5 lines.
- Łódź Agglomeration Railway is located in the center of Poland, connecting satellite towns in and around Łódź. It also operates some trains between Łódź and Warsaw.
- Szybka Kolej Miejska w Trójmieście is located in the Tricity/Trójmiasto urban area, the three cities of Gdańsk, Gdynia, and Sopot.

The Proastiakos (Greek: Προαστιακός; "suburban") is Greece's suburban railway (commuter rail) services, which are run by TrainOSE, on infrastructure owned by the Hellenic Railways Organisation (OSE). There are three Proastiakos networks, servicing the country's three largest cities: Athens, Thessaloniki, and Patras. In particular, the Athenian network is undergoing modifications to completely separate it from mainline traffic by rerouting the tracks through a tunnel beneath the city center. A similar project is planned for the Patras network, whereas a new line is due to be constructed for the Thessalonian network.

In Romania, the first commuter trains were introduced in December 2019. They operate between Bucharest and Funduea or Buftea.

BG Voz is an urban rail system that serves Belgrade. It currently has only two routes, with plans for further expansion. Between the early 1990s and mid-2010s, there was another system, known as Beovoz, that was used to provide mass-transit service within the Belgrade metropolitan area, as well as to nearby towns, similarly to RER in Paris. Beovoz had more lines and far more stops than the current system. However, it was abandoned in favor of more accurate BG Voz, mostly due to inefficiency. While current services rely mostly on existing infrastructure, any further development requires expanding capacity (railway expansion and new trains). Plans for further extension of the system include another two lines, one of which should reach Belgrade Nikola Tesla Airport.

In Russia, Ukraine, and some other countries of the former Soviet Union, electric multiple-unit suburban passenger trains called Elektrichka are widespread. The first such system in Russia is the Oranienbaum Electric Line in Saint Petersburg. In Moscow, the Beskudnikovskaya railway branch existed between the 1940s and 1980s. The trains running along it did not serve the main lines, so it was used for city transport. Today, there are the Moscow Central Circle and the Moscow Central Diameters.

In Turkey, Marmaray line stations from Sirkeci to Halkalı are located on the European side.

=== Americas ===
==== North America ====
In the United States, Canada, Costa Rica, El Salvador, and Mexico, regional passenger rail services are provided by government or quasi-governmental agencies, with the busiest and most extensive rail networks in the Northeastern US, California, and Eastern Canada. Most North American commuter railways utilize diesel locomotive propulsion, except for services in New York City, Philadelphia, Chicago, Denver, San Francisco, and Mexico City; New York's commuter rail lines use a combination of third rail and overhead wire power generation, while Chicago only has two out of twelve services that are electrified. Many newer and proposed systems in Canada and the United States are often geared toward serving peak-hour commutes rather than the all-day systems of Europe, East Asia, and Australia.

===== United States =====
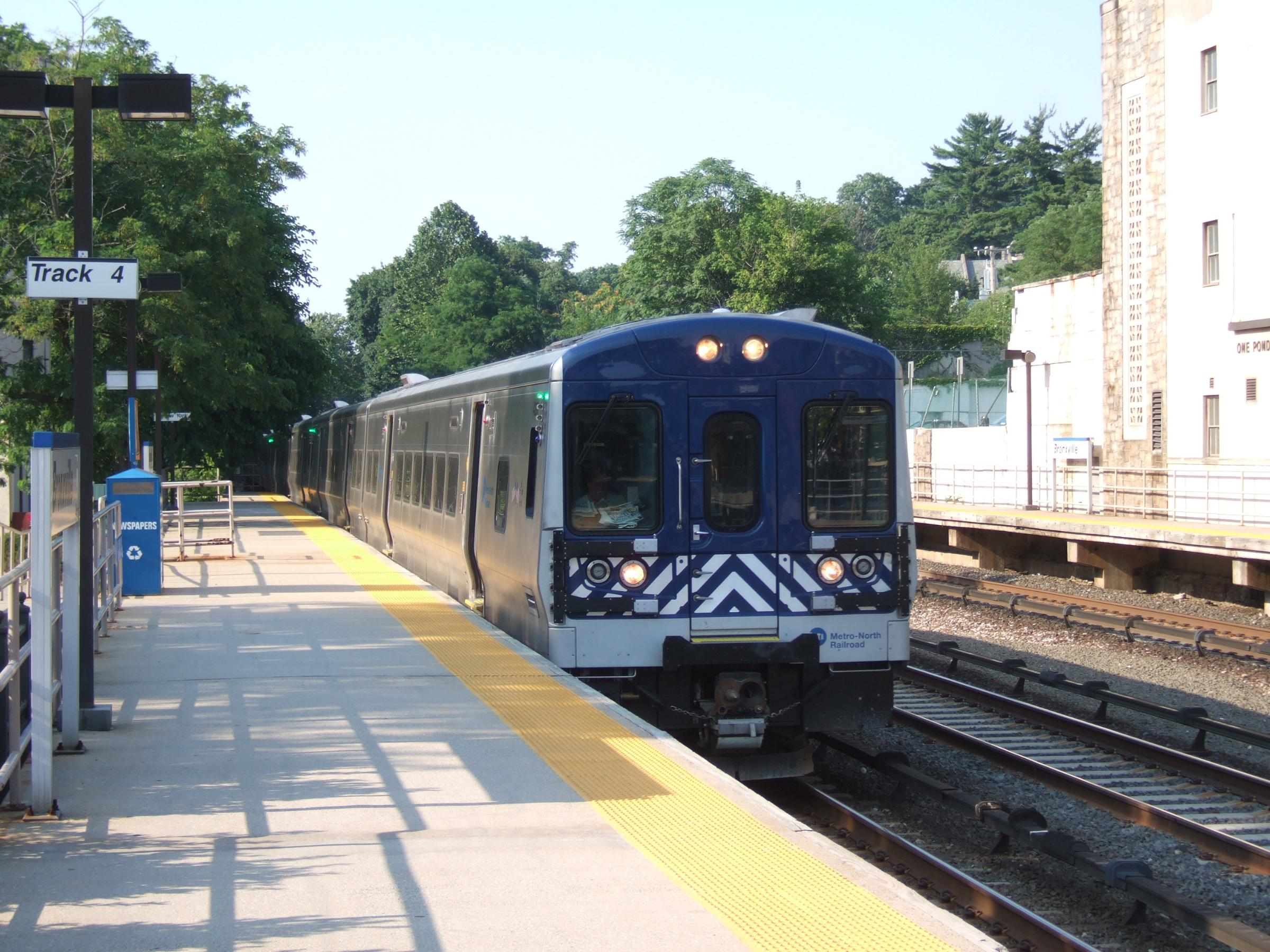
An M7 train at Bronxville on the Harlem Line of the Metro-North Railroad, serving northern portions of the New York metropolitan area

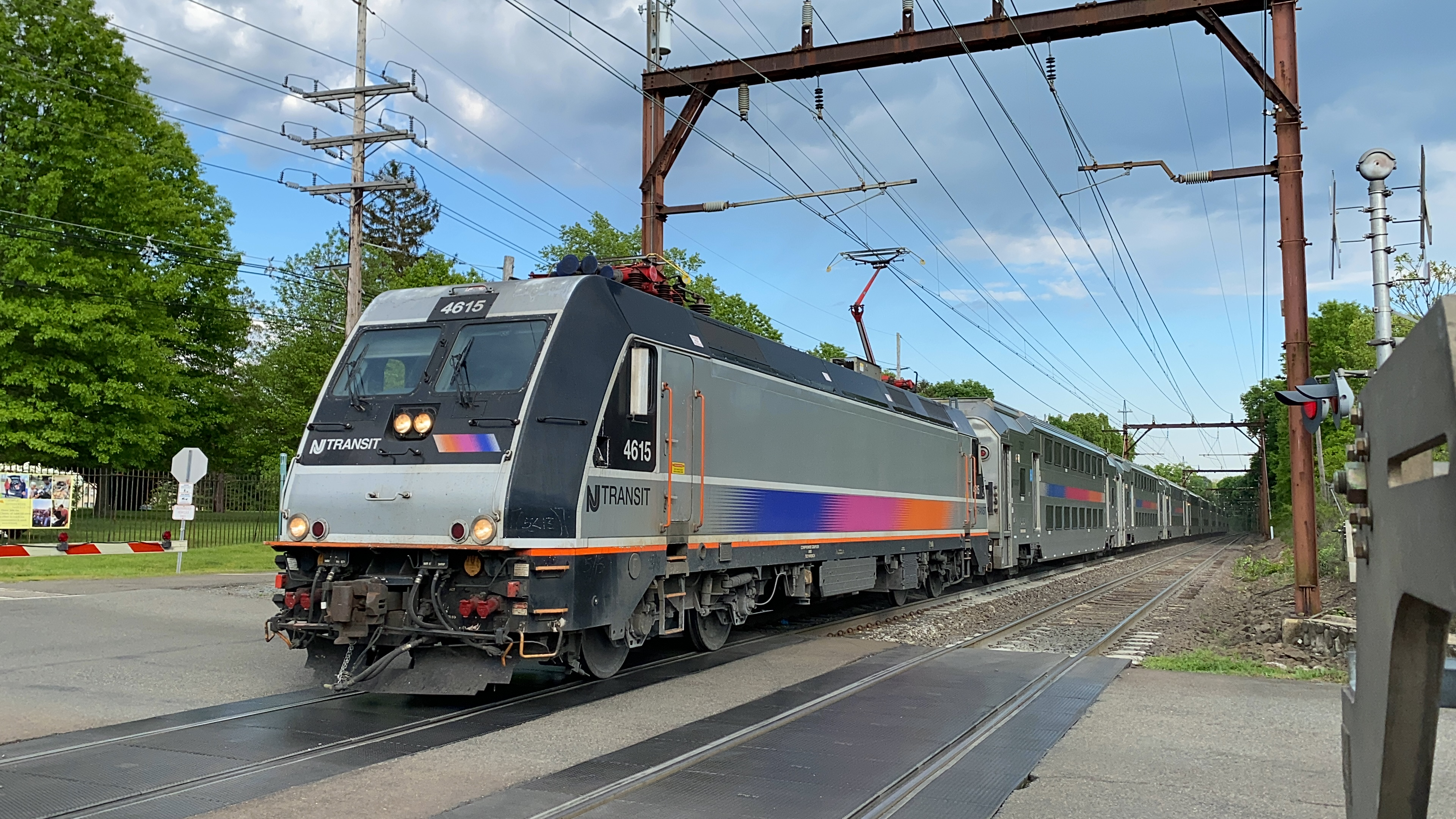
NJ Transit serves New Jersey as well as parts of New York and Pennsylvania.

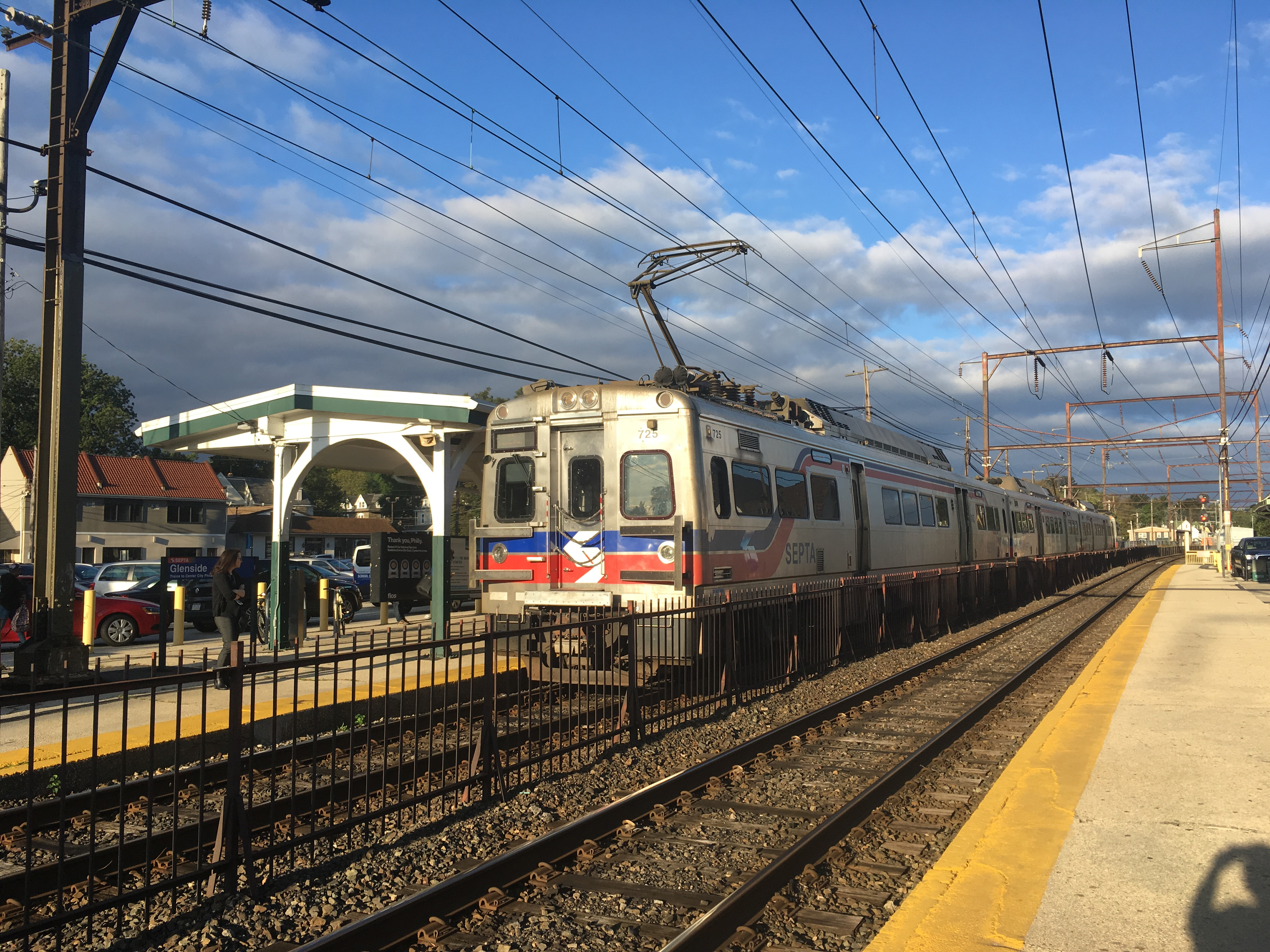
SEPTA Regional Rail serves Philadelphia and its suburbs.

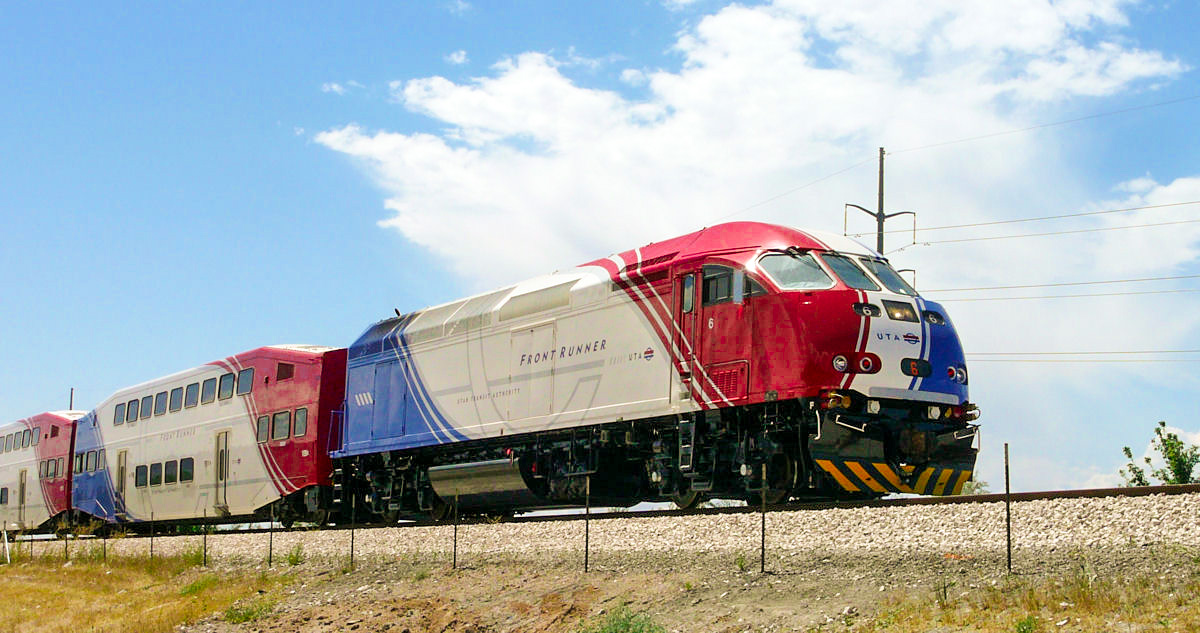
The FrontRunner commuter rail system serves Utah's Wasatch Front.

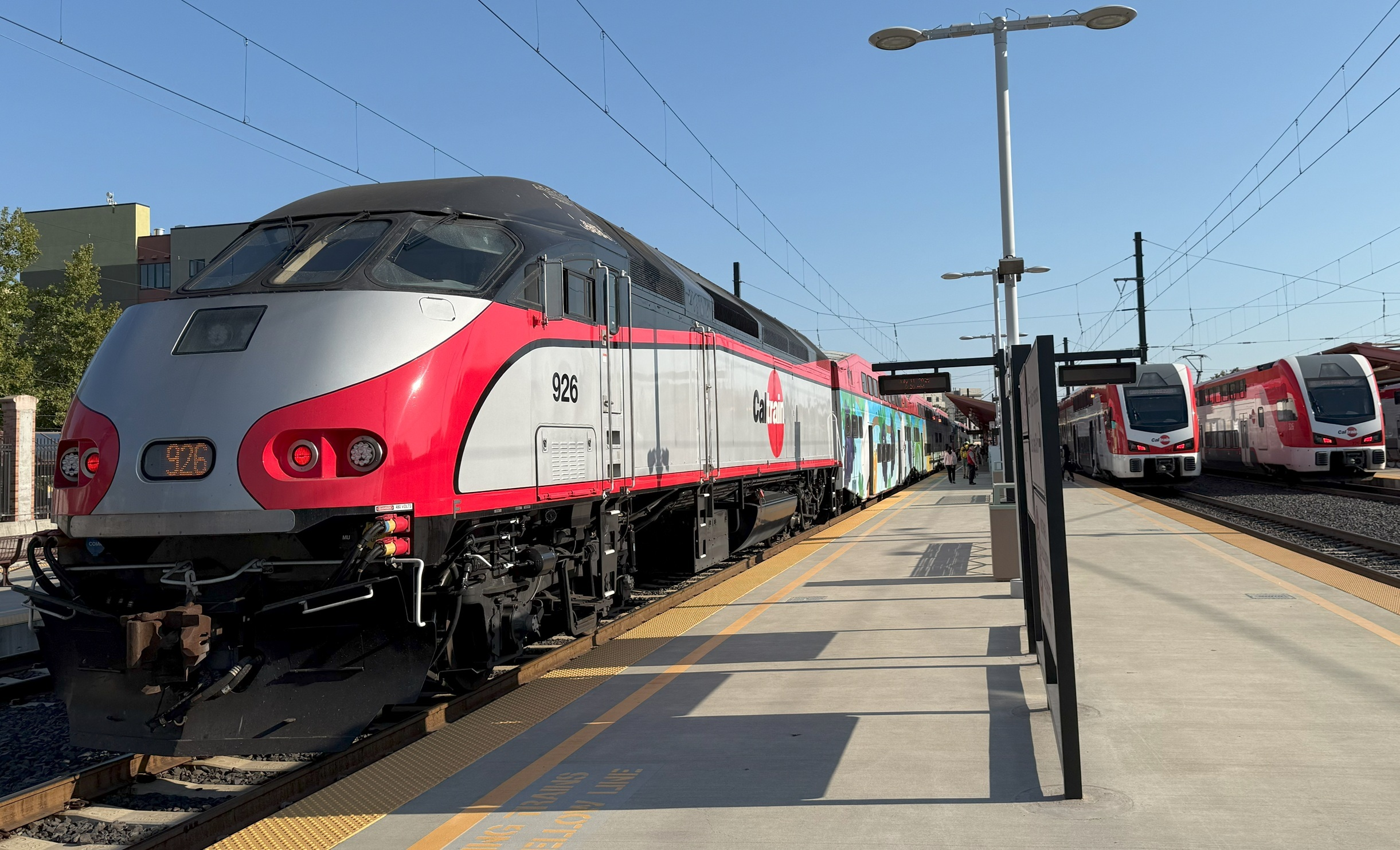
Caltrain is a high-frequency commuter rail serving the San Francisco Bay Area

Eight commuter rail systems in the United States carried over ten million trips each in 2018, those being listed in descending order:

- Metropolitan Transportation Authority's Long Island Rail Road, serving New York City and Long Island
- NJ Transit Rail Operations, serving New York City, New Jersey (Newark, Trenton) and Philadelphia
- Metropolitan Transportation Authority's Metro-North Railroad, serving New York (Yonkers and New York City) and Southwest Connecticut (New Haven)
- Metra, serving northeast Illinois (Chicago) and Kenosha, Wisconsin. The network consists of 11 services, of which only the Electric District service runs on tracks exclusively used for passenger traffic.
  - The South Shore Line is a commuter line that serves the South Side and northern Indiana. Although the line is operated by NICTD, an agency separate from Metra, the line runs along the Metra Electric Line north of Kensington/115th Street station.
- SEPTA Regional Rail, serving southeast Pennsylvania (Philadelphia), as well as Wilmington, Delaware, and Trenton, New Jersey. The network features a tunneled corridor through the city center and through-routed services from several commuter lines. The arrangement of services through the corridor was originally proposed by Vukan Vuchic and Shinya Kikuchi in 1984 and 1985.
- MBTA Commuter Rail, serving Massachusetts (Boston, Worcester, Lowell) and Providence, Rhode Island
- Caltrain, serving Bay Area California (San Francisco, San Jose, and the San Francisco Peninsula)
- Metrolink, serving Southern California (Los Angeles, Burbank, Anaheim, San Bernardino, and Southern California)

Other commuter rail systems in the United States (not in ridership order) are:

- CTRail, serving Connecticut (Hartford, New Haven and New London)
- Utah Transit Authority FrontRunner, serving Utah (Wasatch Front)
- North County Transit District Coaster, serving Southern California (San Diego County)
- Maryland Area Regional Commuter, serving western Maryland (Baltimore, Frederick), Washington, D.C., and West Virginia (Harpers Ferry)
- Virginia Railway Express, serving suburbs of Northern Virginia and Washington, D.C.
- Sounder commuter rail, serving Washington (Seattle / Tacoma)
- Tri-Rail, serving southeastern Florida (Miami / Fort Lauderdale / West Palm Beach)
- Trinity Railway Express, serving Texas (Dallas / Fort Worth)
- Westside Express Service, serving northwestern Oregon (Beaverton / Wilsonville)
- Altamont Corridor Express, serving northern California (San Jose / Stockton)
- SunRail, serving central Florida (Orlando/Poinciana)
- New Mexico Rail Runner Express, serving New Mexico (Albuquerque)
- CapMetro Rail, serving Texas (Austin)
- A-train, serving Texas (Denton County)
- SMART, serving northern California (Sonoma and Marin counties)
- WeGo Star, serving Nashville and Lebanon, Tennessee.
- Denver's RTD four electrified commuter rail lines – the A, B, G and N Lines, run on segregated tracks. In its entirety, the system combines elements of tram-train and commuter rail.

===== Canada =====
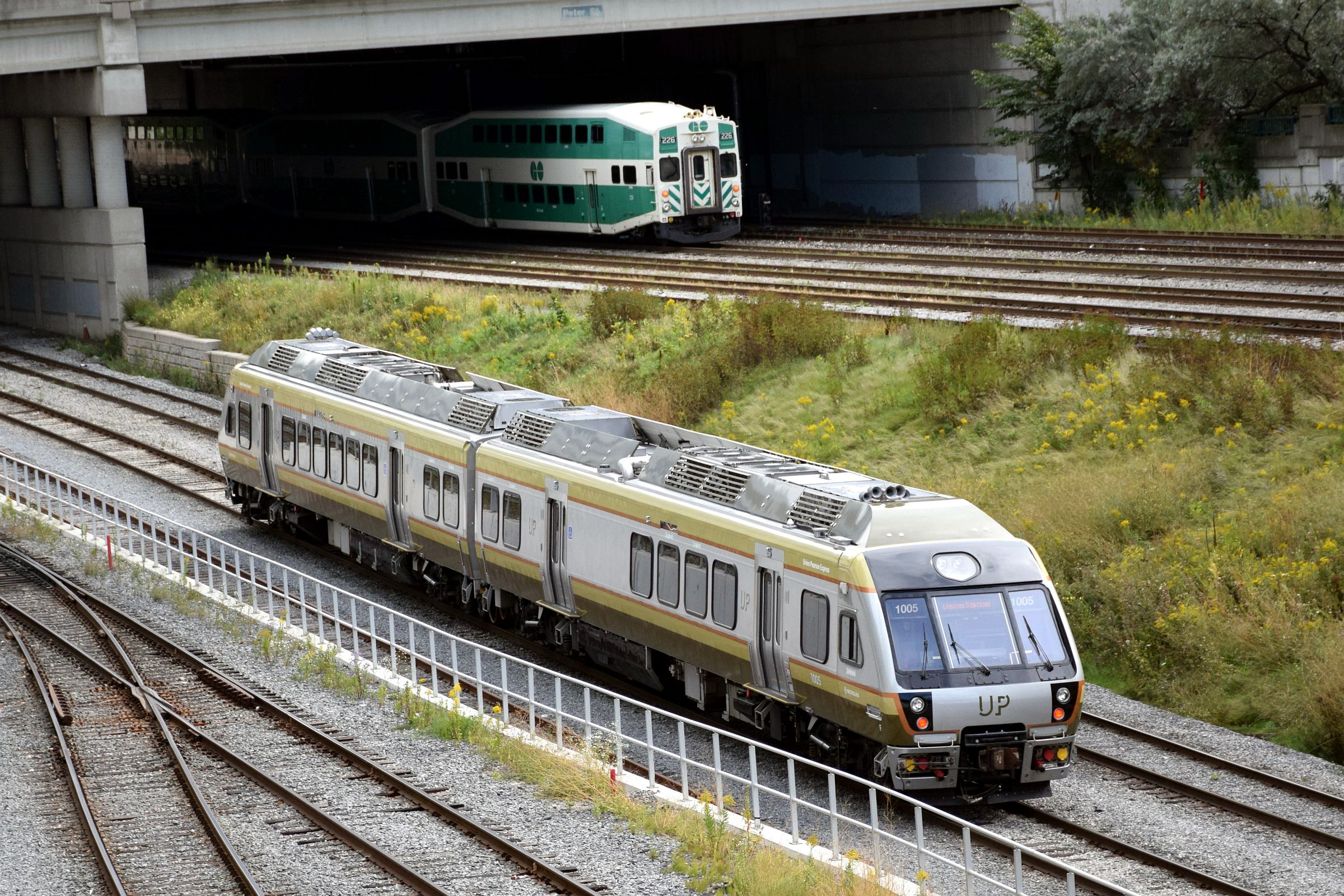
UP Express and GO Transit both serve the Toronto area.

- Exo commuter rail in Montreal
- GO Transit rail services in Toronto
- West Coast Express in Vancouver
- UP Express in Toronto

===== Mexico =====
- Suburban Railway of the Valley of Mexico Metropolitan Area serving Mexico City
- Toluca–Mexico City commuter rail serving Toluca and Mexico City

===== Central America =====
- Rail Transport in Costa Rica serving San Jose

==== South America ====
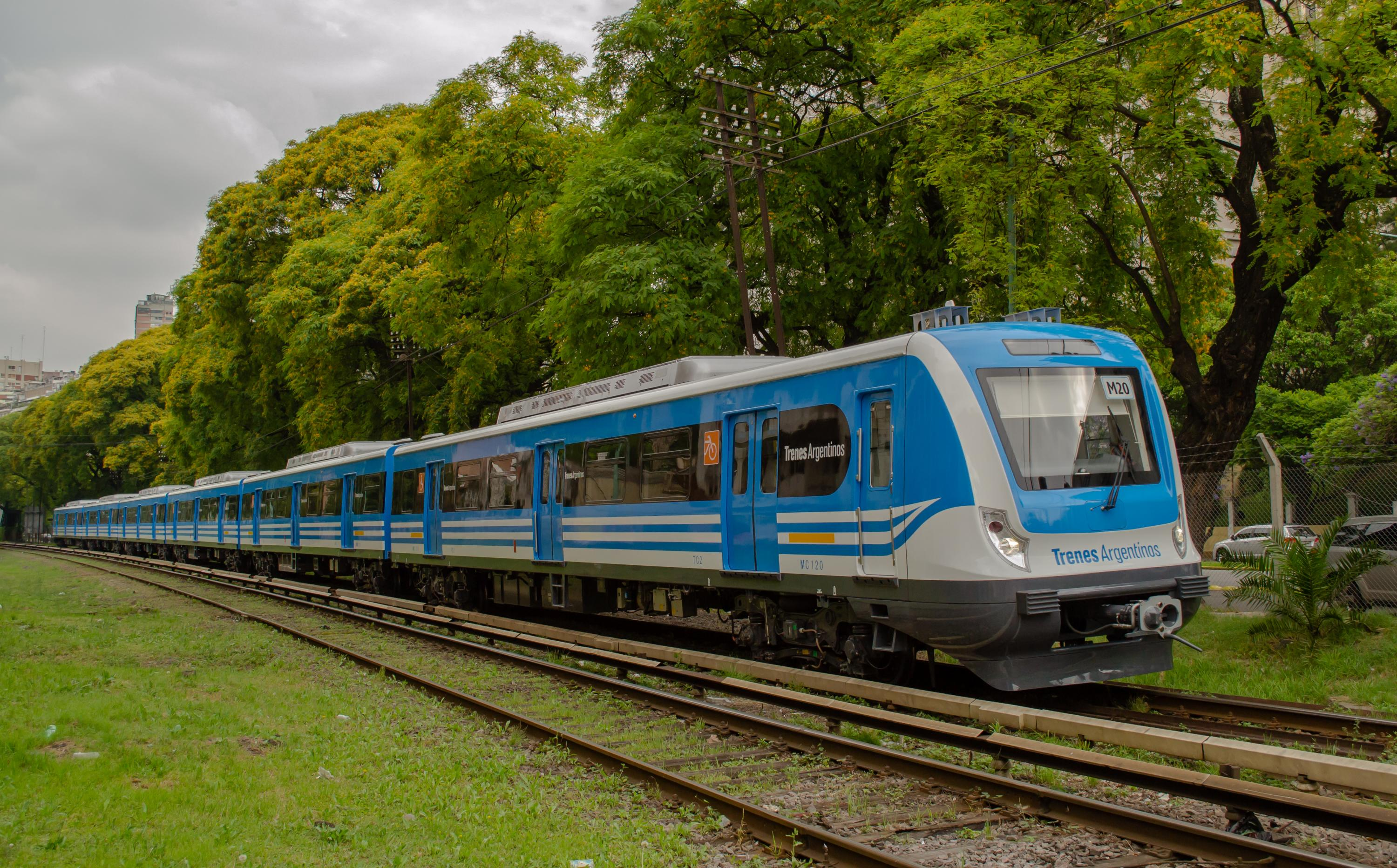
The Mitre Line is part of the extensive Buenos Aires metropolitan rail system.

Examples include an 899 km (559 mi) commuter system in the Buenos Aires metropolitan area, the 225 km (140 mi) long Supervia in Rio de Janeiro, the Metrotrén in Santiago, Chile, and the Valparaíso Metro in Valparaíso, Chile.

Another example is Companhia Paulista de Trens Metropolitanos (CPTM) in Greater São Paulo, Brazil. CPTM has 94 stations across 7 lines, numbered starting at 7 (lines 1 to 6 and line 15 belong to the São Paulo Metro), with a total length of 273 kilometres (170 mi). Trains operate at high frequencies on tracks used exclusively for commuter traffic. In Rio de Janeiro SuperVia provides electrified commuter rail services.

=== Oceania ===
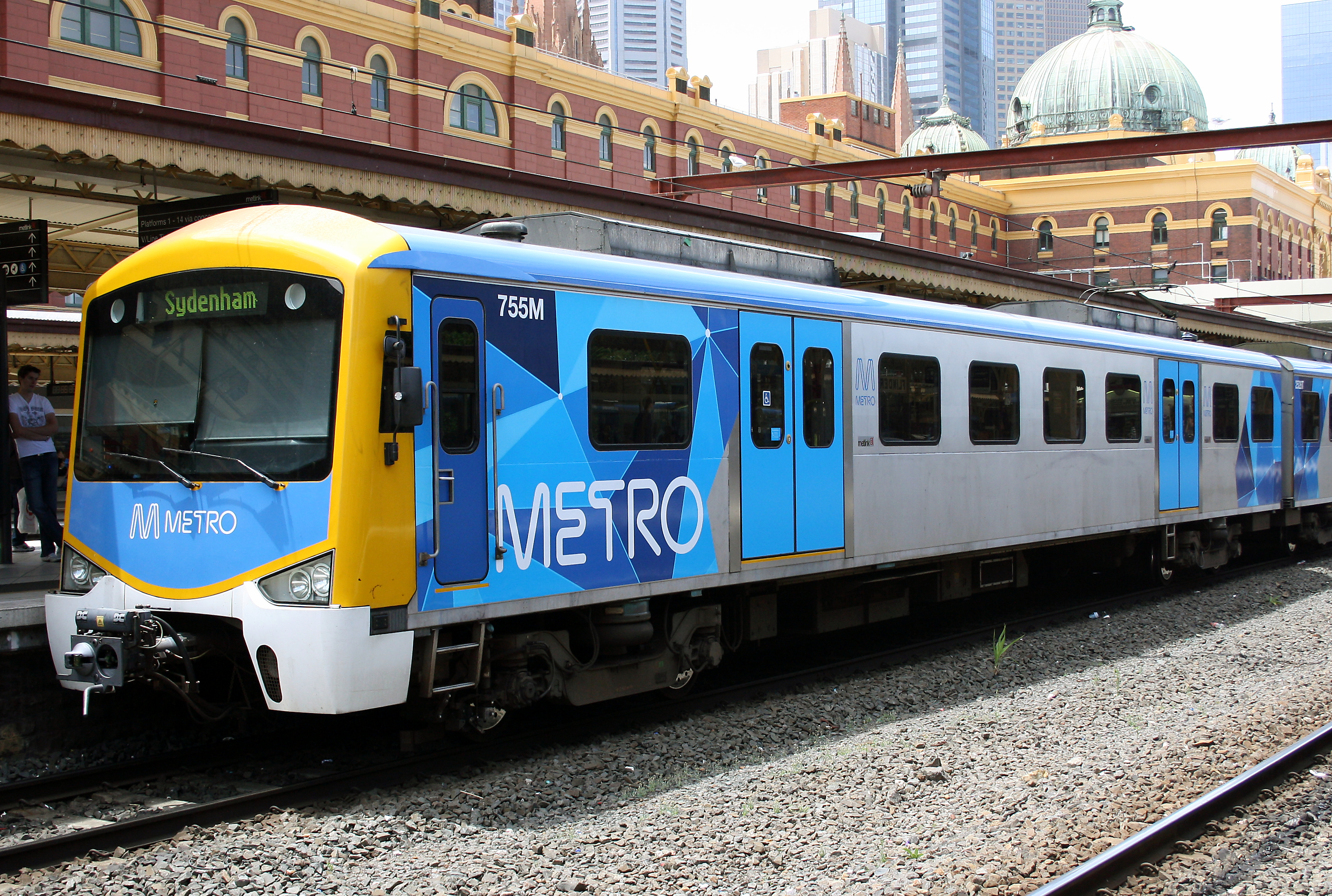
A Siemens Nexas used on the Metro Trains Melbourne network

The five major cities in Australia have suburban railway systems in their metropolitan areas. These networks have frequent services, with frequencies varying from every 10 to every 30 minutes on most suburban lines, and up to 3–5 minutes in peak on bundled underground lines in the city centers of Sydney, Brisbane, Perth, and Melbourne. The networks in each state developed from mainline railways and have never been completely operationally separate from long-distance and freight traffic, unlike metro systems. The suburban networks are almost completely electrified.

The main suburban rail networks in Australia are:

- The Sydney Trains suburban rail network consists of nine lines converging in the underground City Circle with frequencies as high as three minutes in this section, 5–10 minutes at most major stations all day, and 15 minutes at most minor stations all day.
- The Sydney rail network operated by Sydney Trains in Sydney (with connected suburban services in Newcastle and Wollongong run by its counterpart intercity operator, NSW TrainLink).
- Melbourne's rail network features sixteen electrified commuter rail lines traversing the city center in the underground City Loop, providing a metro-like service in the central core. A second underground core, the Metro Tunnel, opened in 2025. V/Line operates some commuter services between Melbourne and surrounding towns, as well as between Melbourne and some locations within the Melbourne metropolitan area.
- Commuter rail services in Brisbane are provided under the Queensland Rail City network brand, featuring twelve electrified lines converging in the city center. Cross River Rail is an under-construction underground cross-city tunnel to relieve pressure on this network.
- Railways in Perth fall under the Transperth network, which are operated by the Public Transport Authority
- The Adelaide rail network operated by Adelaide Metro in Adelaide.

New Zealand has two frequent suburban rail services comparable to those in Australia: the Auckland rail network is operated by Auckland One Rail, and the Wellington rail network is operated by Transdev Wellington.

== Hybrid systems ==
Hybrid urban-suburban rail systems that exhibit characteristics of both rapid transit and commuter rail, serving a metropolitan region, are common in German-speaking countries, where they are known as S-Bahn. Other examples include: Lazio regional railways in Rome, the RER in France and the London Overground, Elizabeth line, London Underground Metropolitan line in London and Merseyrail in Liverpool. Comparable systems can be found in Australia, such as Sydney Trains and Metro Trains Melbourne, and in Japan, where many urban and suburban lines are operated by JR East/West and third-party companies and run at metro-style frequencies. In contrast, comparable systems of this type are generally rare in the United States and Canada, where peak-hour frequencies are more common.

In Asia, the construction of higher-speed urban-suburban rail links has gained traction in various countries, such as in India, with the Delhi RRTS, in China, with the Pearl River Delta Metropolitan Region intercity railway, and in South Korea, with the Great Train eXpress system. These systems usually run on dedicated elevated or underground tracks for most of their route and have features comparable to Higher-speed rail.

== See also ==
- Charabanc
- List of suburban and commuter rail systems
- Public transport
- Commuting
- Cercanías, the commuter rail systems of Spain's major metropolitan areas
- Commuter rail in the United Kingdom
- Commuter rail in North America
- Commuter rail in Australia
- Regional rail
- S-Bahn, the combined city center and suburban railway system metro in Austria, Germany, Switzerland, and Denmark
