= Transport in India =

The Golden Quadrilateral connects the four major metro cities of India, viz., Delhi (north), Mumbai (west), Kolkata (east), Chennai (south).

Transport in India consists of transport by land, water and air. Road transport is the primary mode of transport for most Indian citizens, and India's road transport systems are among the most heavily used in the world. The growth of highway construction in India, fuelled by fast GDP growth (world's 3rd largest in PPP and 4th largest nominally), has reduced India's logistics costs to 9% (2025) compared to 8% in China, 12% in USA and EU.

India's road network is the largest, and the busiest in the world, transporting 8.225 billion passengers and over 980 million tonnes of cargo annually, as of 2015. India's rail network is the fourth largest and second busiest in the world, transporting 8.09 billion passengers and 1.20 billion tonnes of freight annually, as of 2020. Aviation in India is broadly divided into military and civil aviation. India is the fastest-growing aviation market in the world (IATA data). India's waterways network, in the form of rivers, canals, backwaters and creeks, is the ninth largest waterway network in the world. Freight transport by waterways is highly under utilised in India with the total cargo moved (in tonne kilometres) by inland waterways being 0.1 percent of the total inland traffic in India. In total, about 21 percent of households have two wheelers whereas 4.70 percent of households in India have cars or vans as per the 2011 census of India. The automobile industry in India is currently growing rapidly with an annual production of over 28.4 million vehicles (2025), with an annual growth rate of 10.5% (2015) and vehicle volume is expected to rise greatly in the future.

For the construction of green highways and to reduce the piles of municipal waste, India aims to reuse all of the existing piles of garbage for the road construction by 2027, of which 80 trillion ton of solid waste has been already segregated and reused for the highway construction as of 2025.

== Research and education ==
The Indian transport research and education ecosystem is a multi-modal network designed to address the nation's logistical, safety, and strategic needs. This landscape is characterised by a duality: sectors that require centralised governance, and decentralised urban sectors that require policy-driven innovation. The foundational pillars of the centralised system are the domains of Rail and Space. This multi-modal ecosystem is geared towards generating solutions for India's future mobility challenges across transport verticals.

=== Transport policy ===
- Research: Organisations like Institute for Transportation and Development Policy (ITDP) India translate the technical findings into tangible policy action, assisting municipal corporations in implementing successful Bus Rapid Transit (BRT) systems and creating Complete Streets networks that prioritise walking and cycling, which is vital given India's large population.

=== Space transport ===
- Research in space transport is managed entirely by the ISRO under the Department of Space, with specialised centres like the Vikram Sarabhai Space Centre (VSSC) for launch vehicle design and the Liquid Propulsion Systems Centre (LPSC) for propulsion systems.
- Education: Indian Institute of Space Science and Technology (IIST), Asia's first space university, for aerospace and avionics engineering.

=== Roads and urban mobility ===
- Research: Research in Road, Urban Mobility, and Maritime logistics is highly collaborative, integrating government mandates with academic and non-governmental expertise. The CSIR-Central Road Research Institute (CSIR-CRRI) is the national apex body for road infrastructure, dedicated to advancing pavement technology, geotechnical stability, and the implementation of Intelligent Transport Systems (ITS) to enhance cost-efficiency and safety.
- Education: Specialised academic centres ensure policy is informed by cutting-edge science: the Transportation Research and Injury Prevention Programme (TRIPP) at IIT Delhi is globally recognised for its pioneering work on Vulnerable Road Users (VRUs), directly influencing indigenous vehicle and safety standards. The focus on sustainable urban mobility is further advanced by the Centre of Excellence in Urban Transport (CoE-UT) at IIT Madras, which models advanced solutions for connected intelligent transportation (CIUT) and advises on concepts like Transit-Oriented Development (TOD) and Low Emission Zones (LEZ).

=== Railways ===
- Research in Rail development is anchored by the Research Designs and Standards Organisation (RDSO) under the Ministry of Railways, which is responsible for standardisation, design, and developing safety systems like Kavach and sustainable solutions such as the Hydrogen Train model.
- Education: The specialised talent needed for these high-technology fields is systematically cultivated by dedicated universities, such as Gati Shakti Vishwavidyalaya (GSV) for rail and transport analytics.

=== Maritime logistics ===
- Research: The Centre for Maritime Logistics (CML) at GMU focuses research on digitalisation and automation to maximise logistical efficiency across shipping, ports, and freight forwarding, directly supporting the strategic goals outlined in the national Maritime India Vision 2030.

=== List of research and educational institutes and think tanks ===
| Category/Mode | Institution | Institutional Affiliation | Primary Research/Educational Focus | Notes |
|---|---|---|---|---|
| Space Transport (Launch R&D) | Vikram Sarabhai Space Centre (VSSC), Thiruvananthapuram | ISRO / Dept. of Space | Design and development of launch vehicle technology (PSLV, GSLV, RLV, Gaganyaan), including aeronautics, avionics, materials, and vehicle integration. | Lead centre for launch vehicle realisation. |
| Space Transport (Propulsion R&D) | Liquid Propulsion Systems Centre (LPSC), Thiruvananthapuram & Bengaluru | ISRO / Dept. of Space | Design, development, and realisation of liquid propulsion stages and cryogenic stages for ISRO's Launch Vehicles, including key component development. | Specialised in developing high-performance propulsion systems. |
| Space Transport (Education) | Indian Institute of Space Science and Technology (IIST), Thiruvananthapuram | Dept. of Space (Autonomous Body) | Undergraduate (Aerospace/Avionics), postgraduate, and doctoral programmes in core space science and technology disciplines. | Asia's first Space University, established to meet demands of the Indian Space Programme. |
| Rail (R&D & Standardisation) | Research Designs and Standards Organisation (RDSO), Lucknow | Ministry of Railways (MoR) | Technical advisory, design, and standardisation of railway equipment; development of indigenous safety systems (**KAVACH**) and sustainable technologies (Hydrogen Train model); publishes standards (e.g., IRS Track Manual). | Functions as the technical consultant to the Railway Board. |
| Rail (Academic Research) | Centre for Railway Research (CRR) | Academic (IIT Madras), MoR Partnership | Applied Computational Intelligence (AI/ML) to railway engineering, focusing on Signal and Communication, Condition Monitoring, and Predictive Maintenance. | Nodal academic research hub for specialised domains assigned by the Ministry of Railways. |
| Rail (Education & Training) | GATI SHAKTI VISHWAVIDYALAYA (GSV) (formerly NRTI), Vadodara | Central University (Ministry of Railways) | Inter-disciplinary B.Tech (Rail Infrastructure), MBA (Transportation & Supply Chain Management), and MSc (Systems Engineering & Analytics) programmes for the transport sector. | India's first university focusing exclusively on the transport sector. |
| Road & Highways (R&D) | CSIR-Central Road Research Institute (CSIR-CRRI), New Delhi | CSIR | Scientific advancement of road design, construction, maintenance (Pavements, Bridges, Geotech), Traffic Safety, and the adoption of Intelligent Transport Systems (ITS). | Dedicated to shaping national policies and standards for road infrastructure. |
| Road (Operational & Automotive) | Central Institute of Road Transport (CIRT) | Related to Ministry of Road Transport and Highways (MoRTH) | Research concerning the management and operational aspects of road transport services and public sector efficiency. | Focuses on operational and management training. |
| Road (Operational & Automotive) | Automotive Research Association of India (ARAI) | Industry Association | Vehicle technology, testing, and certification, addressing compatibility with road environment and safety norms. | |
| Urban Mobility, Traffic Design & Safety (Pedestrian Focus) | Transportation Research and Injury Prevention Programme (TRIPP) | Academic (IIT Delhi), WHO Collaborating Centre | Pioneering research on Vulnerable Road Users (pedestrians, cyclists); promoting indigenous safety solutions and influencing helmet/vehicle standards. | Integrates mobility, safety, and environmental concerns. |
| Urban Mobility, ITS & Planning | Centre of Excellence in Urban Transport (CoE-UT) | Academic (IIT Madras), Industry Supported | Modelling Connected Intelligent Urban Transportation (CIUT), TOD, Low Emission Zones (LEZ), and providing advisory services for Metros/BRT. | Focuses on developing solutions for heterogeneous urban transport systems. |
| Urban Policy & Complete Streets | Institute for Transportation and Development Policy (ITDP) India | Non-Governmental Organisation (NGO) | Translating research into municipal policy implementation; successful projects in Bus Rapid Transit (BRT) and development of Complete Streets networks prioritising NMT. | Provides technical assistance for politically sensitive urban reforms. |
| Maritime & Logistics (R&D) | CML | Academic (GMU) | Improving efficiency and sustainability of maritime logistics through digitalisation, automation, and data-driven strategies for ports, shipping, and freight forwarding. | Aligned with Maritime India Vision 2030 goals. |
| Maritime & Logistics (Education) | Gujarat Maritime University (GMU) | Academic/State University | Education, research, and training in maritime and logistics, including executive education on topics like Public Private Partnerships (PPP) and industry-academia linkages. | |
| Academic (Specialised Planning) | School of Planning and Architecture (SPA), New Delhi / Vijayawada | Academic (Central University) | Offers specialised Master's Degree programmes in Traffic and Transportation Planning. | Programmes recognised by the Institute of Town Planners, India (ITPI). |
| Academic (Specialised Planning) | CEPT University, Ahmedabad | Academic | Offers Master's in Urban Transport Systems, promoting an integrated planning approach across roads, railways, land use, and governance. | |
| Academic (General Transport Engineering) | Indian Institutes of Technology (IITs) (e.g., Bombay, Roorkee, Delhi, Madras) | Academic | Offers core graduate-level programmes (Masters/PhD) in Transportation Engineering and related Transportation Systems Engineering. | Provides core engineering and analytical talent for the sector. |

== Pre-modern transport ==
=== Walking ===
Walking was a major transport form in ancient times. People used to cover long distances on foot or bull carts. For instance, Adi Sankaracharya travelled all over India from Kalady near Kochi. Walking still constitutes an important mode of transport in rural areas. In the city of Mumbai, to further improve the transit conditions for pedestrians, the Mumbai Metropolitan Region Development Authority, has commenced the construction of more than 50 skywalks, as part of the Mumbai Skywalk project, which is very helpful as walk enthusiasts take part in reducing traffic. The Dakshineswar Skywalk has also come up in West Bengal.

=== Palanquins ===
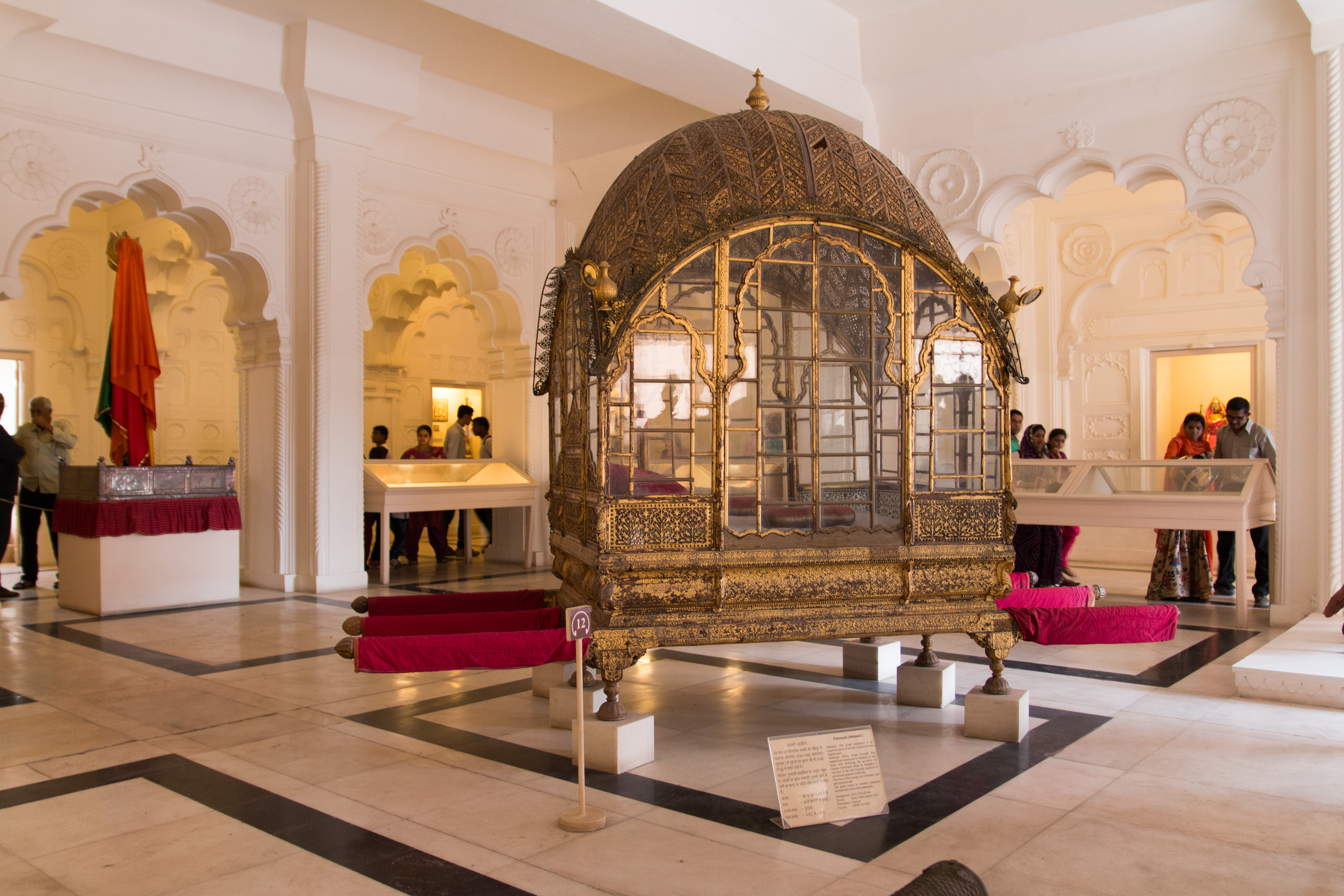
Royal Palanquin of Mehrangarh Fort

Palanquins, also known as palkis, were one of the luxurious methods used by the rich, monarchs and noblemen for travelling and also to carry a deity (idol) of a god. Many temples have sculptures of a god being carried in palkis. Modern use of the palanquin is limited to Indian weddings, pilgrimage and carrying idols of gods.

=== Bullock carts ===
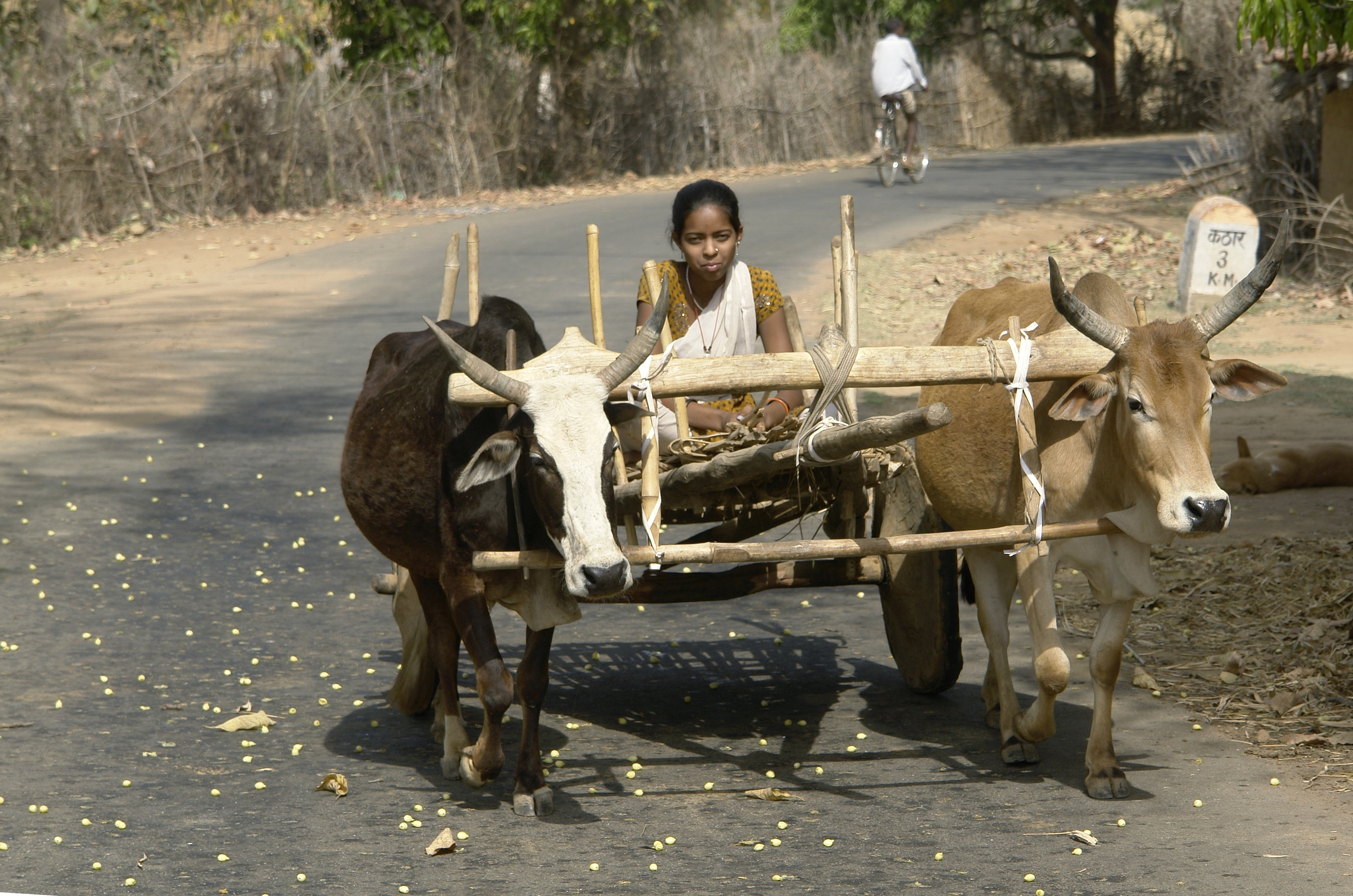
A bullock cart

Bullock carts used to be a way of transportation in India, but it is seldom seen today due to the slow speed and advent of motorised vehicles. It is still prevalent in deep within the rural areas for the transport of goods.

== Aerial ropeways ==
Parvatmala (literally "mountain garland scheme") ropeway network in India is a public transportation system where cabins, gondolas or open chairs are hauled above the ground with the help of cables. It is world's largest ropeway project, envisages spending ₹1,250 billion (equivalent to ₹1.3 trillion or US$14 billion in 2026) in public–private partnership (PPP) mode over five years till 2030 to build 200 new ropeway projects of more than 1200 km length, which will decongest the traffic in narrow roads of big cities and provide cheaper connectivity in mountainous and touristy areas. Since 30% of India is covered by mountains, the ropeways are specially useful in mountainous areas, where it is difficult to build roads or railway, as lower cost and higher Return on investment (ROI) projects.

== Aviation ==
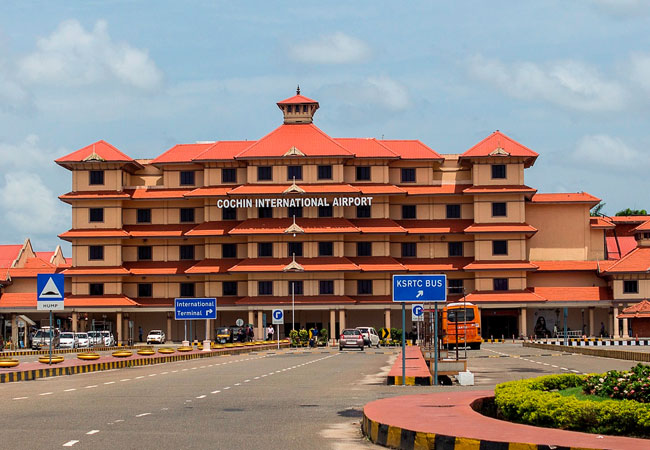
Cochin International Airport is one of the busiest airport in India

Directorate General of Civil Aviation is the national regulatory body for the aviation industry. It is controlled by the Ministry of Civil Aviation. The ministry also controls aviation related autonomous organisations like the Airports Authority of India (AAI), Bureau of Civil Aviation Security (BCAS), Indira Gandhi Rashtriya Uran Akademi and Public Sector Undertakings including Pawan Hans Limited and Hindustan Aeronautics Limited.

Air India is India's national flag carrier, having merged with Indian Airlines in 2011 and plays a major role in connecting India with the rest of the world. IndiGo, Air India, Air India Express, Akasa and Spicejet are the major carriers in order of their market share. These airlines connect more than 80 cities across India and also operate overseas routes after the liberalisation of Indian aviation. Several other foreign airlines connect Indian cities with other major cities across the globe. However, a large section of country's air transport potential remains untapped, even though the Mumbai-Delhi air corridor was ranked the world's tenth busiest route by Amadeus in 2012.

=== Airports ===
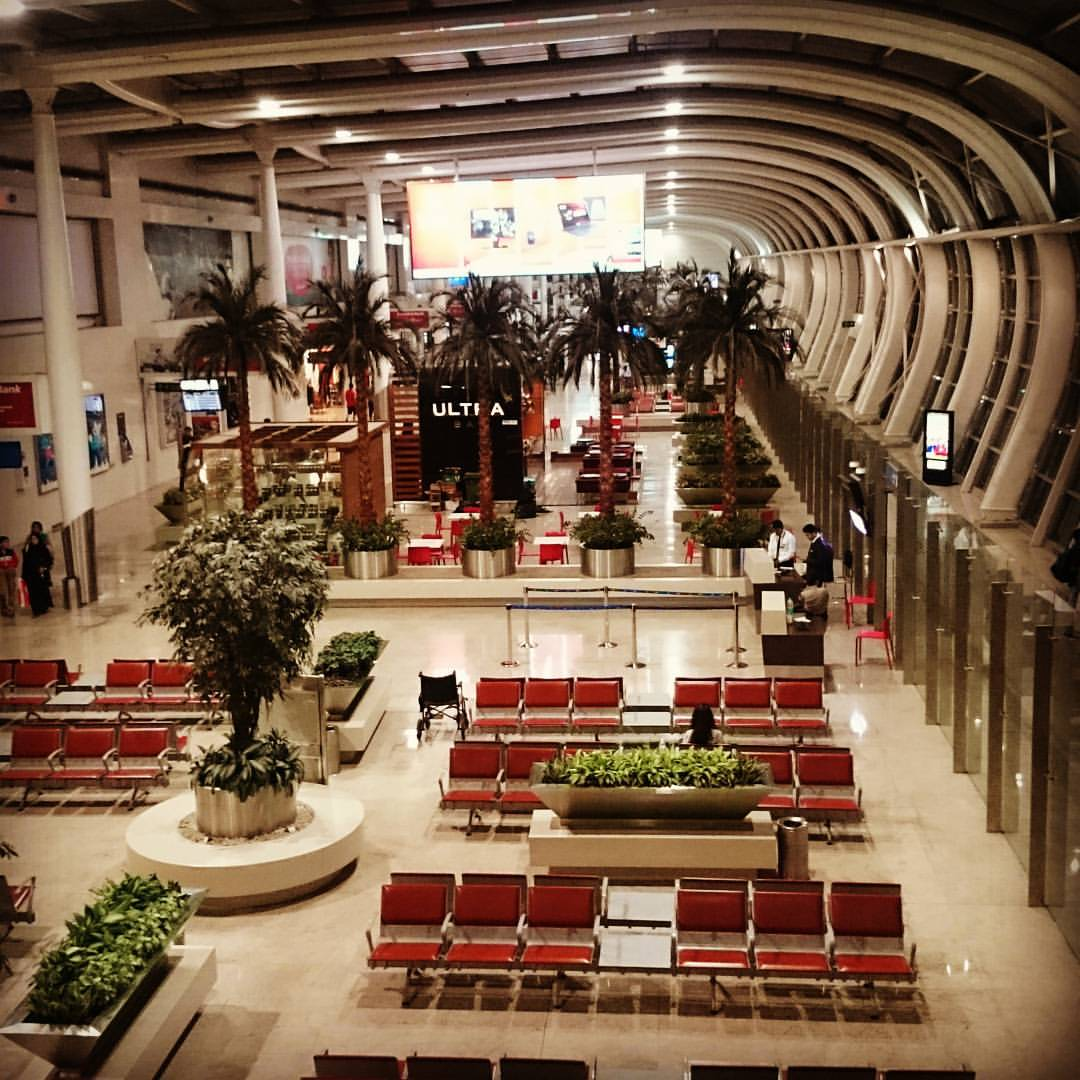
Mumbai Airport Terminal

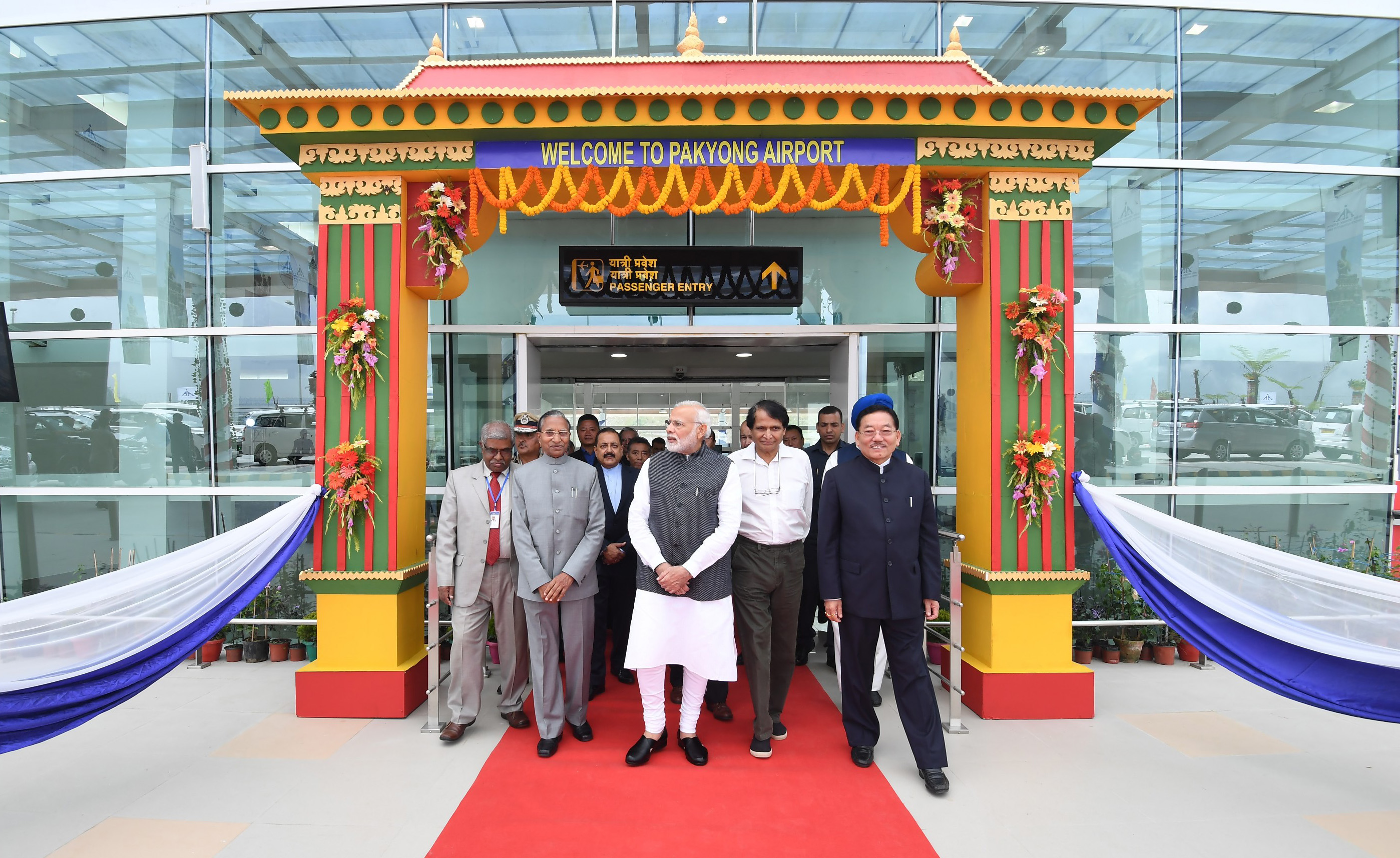
Prime Minister Narendra Modi at the inauguration of Paykong Airport, Sikkim.

While there are 346 civilian airfields in India – 253 with paved runways and 93 with unpaved runways, only 132 were classified as "airports" as of November 2014. Of these, Indira Gandhi International Airport in Delhi is the busiest in the country followed by Mumbai's Chhatrapati Shivaji Maharaj International Airport and Bengaluru's Kempegowda International Airport, all which are world class.

The operations of the major airports in India have been privatised over the past five years and this has resulted in better equipped and cleaner airports. The terminals have either been refurbished or expanded.

India also has 33 "ghost airports," which were built in an effort to make air travel more accessible for those in remote regions but are now non-operational due to a lack of demand. The Jaisalmer Airport in Rajasthan, for example, was completed in 2013 and was expected to host 300,000 passengers a year but has yet to see any commercial flights take off. Despite the number of non-operational airports, India is currently planning on constructing another 200 "low-cost" airports over the next 20 years.

| Length of runways | Airports with paved runways | Airports with unpaved runways |
|---|---|---|
| 3,047 m (9,997 ft) or more | 21 | 1 |
| 2,438 to 3,047 m (7,999 to 9,997 ft) | 59 | 3 |
| 1,524 to 2,438 m (5,000 to 7,999 ft) | 76 | 6 |
| 914 to 1,524 m (2,999 to 5,000 ft) | 82 | 38 |
| Under 914 m (2,999 ft) | 14 | 45 |
| Total | 253 | 93 |

=== Heliports ===
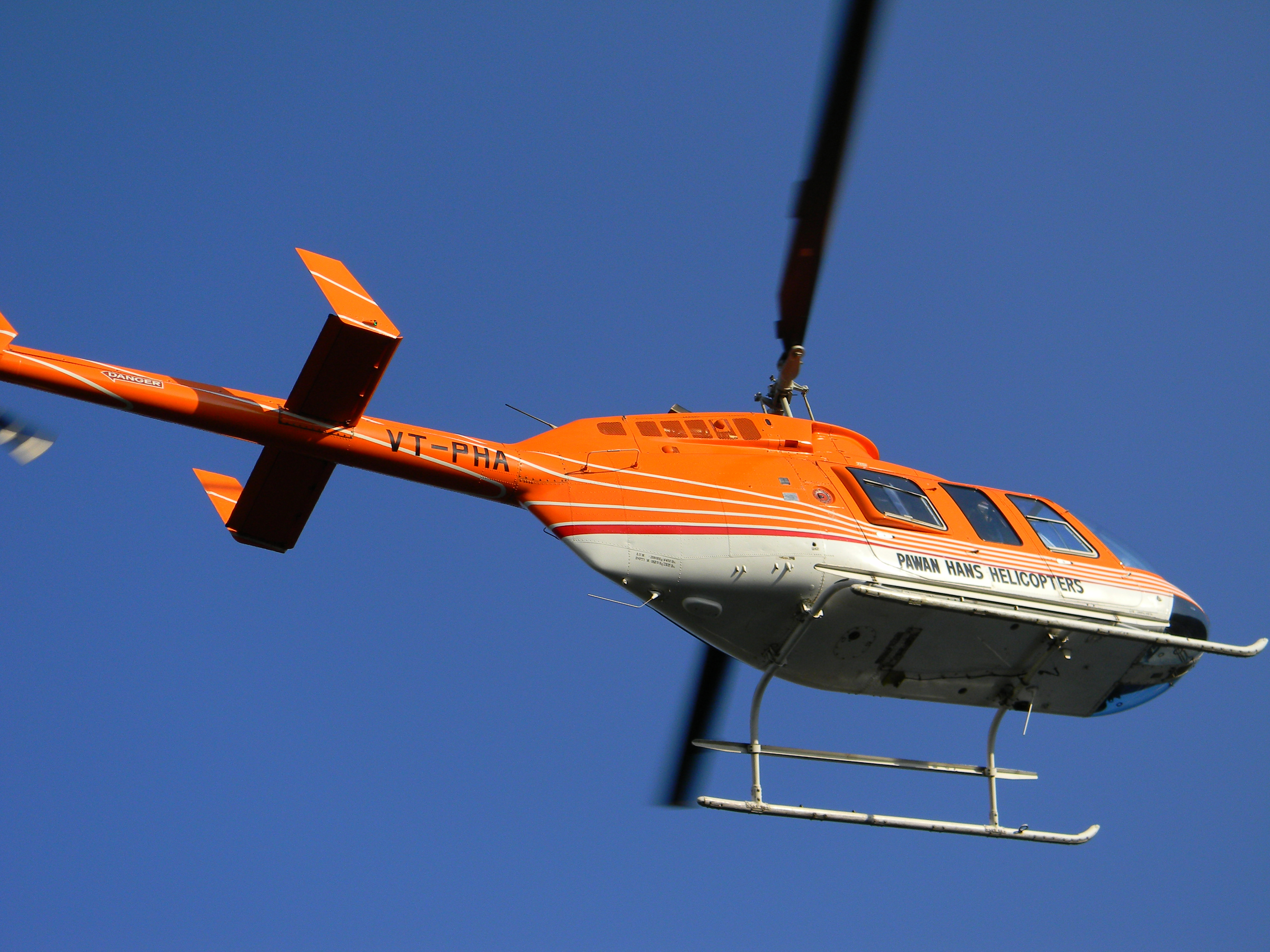
Pawan Hans VT-PHA Helicopter.

As of 2021, there are 45 heliports in India. India also has the world's highest helipad at the Siachen Glacier at a height of 6,400 m (21,000 ft) above mean sea level. Pawan Hans Limited is a public sector company that provides helicopter services to ONGC to its off-shore locations, and also to various State Governments in India, particularly in North-east India.

=== Seaplane ===
Skyhop Aviation plans to launch seaplane operations between Kochi and Lakshadweep using DHC6-400 aircraft.

== Bicycles ==
Bicycles or cycles, have ownership rates ranging from around 30% to 75% at the state level. Along with walking, cycling accounts for 50% to 80% of the commuter trips for those in the informal sector in urban areas. However, recent developments suggest that bicycle riding is quickly becoming popular in Indian cities. In smaller Indian cities, non-motorised transport, which includes cycling, accounts for close to 50% of the total trips by the working-class population. In larger cities like Mumbai, Bengaluru, and Delhi, non-motorised transport accounts for 35%-37% of the total trips. In recent years, government development authorities all over India have encouraged the setup and use of separate bicycle lanes alongside the roads to combat pollution and ease traffic congestion.

=== Human-rickshaws ===
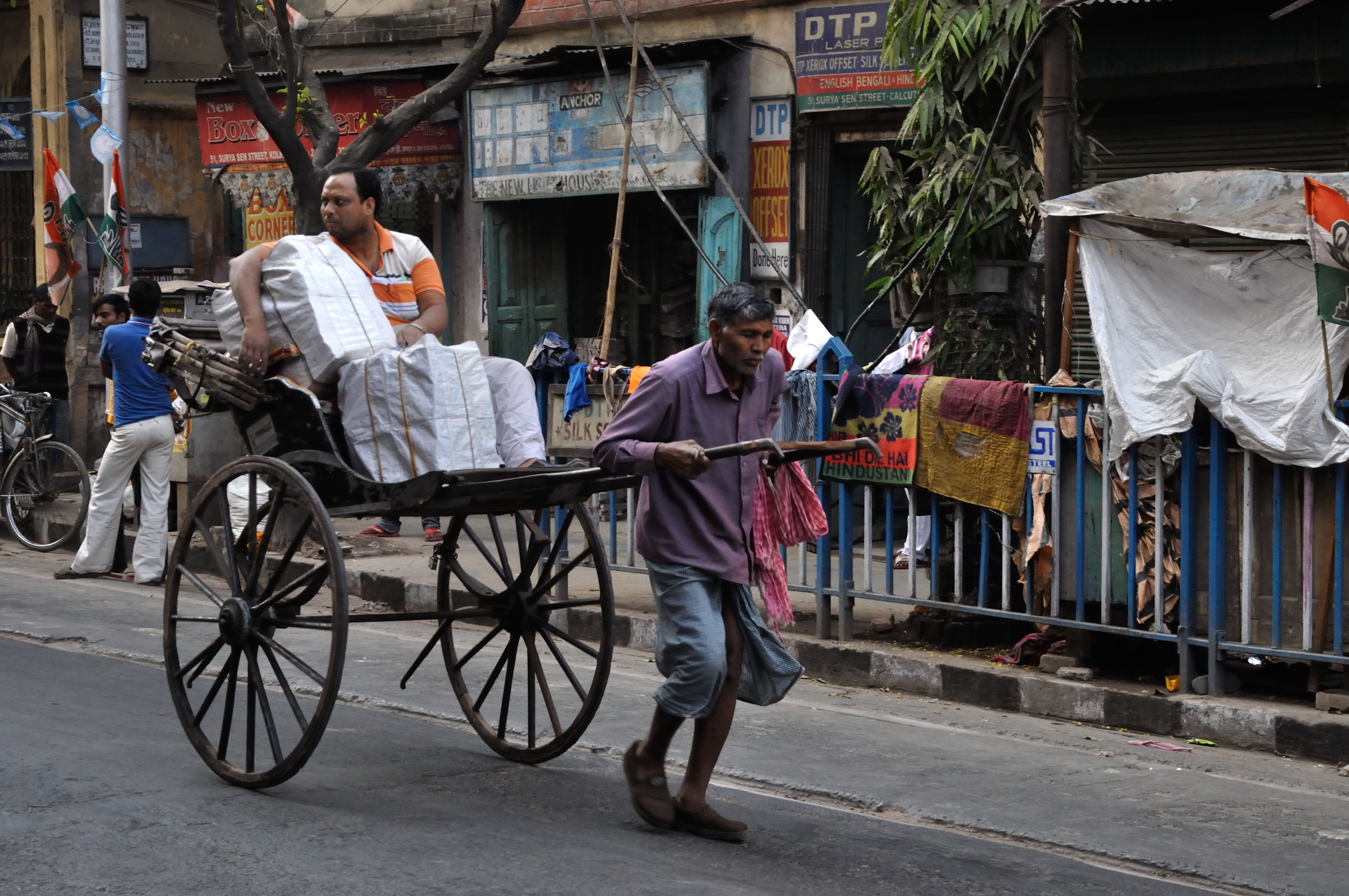
Human-pulled rickshaws still run in Kolkata

Human-pulled rickshaws are nowadays rarely available in various cities and villages in the country. Many local governments have proposed a ban on these rickshaws describing them as "inhuman". The Government of West Bengal proposed a ban on these rickshaws in 2005. Though a bill aiming to address this issue, termed as Calcutta Hackney Carriage Bill, was passed by the West Bengal Assembly in 2006, it has not yet been implemented. The Government of West Bengal is working on an amendment to this bill to avoid the loopholes that were exposed when the Hand-pulled Rickshaw Owners' Association filed a petition against the bill.

=== Cycle rickshaw ===
Cycle rickshaws were introduced in India in the 1940s. They are bigger than a tricycle where two people sit on an elevated seat at the back and a person pedals from the front. In the late 2000s, they were banned in several cities for causing traffic congestion. The Delhi Police recently submitted an affidavit against plying of cycle rickshaws to ease traffic congestion in the city but it was dismissed by the Delhi High Court. In addition, environmentalists have supported the retention of cycle rickshaws as a non-polluting mode of transport.

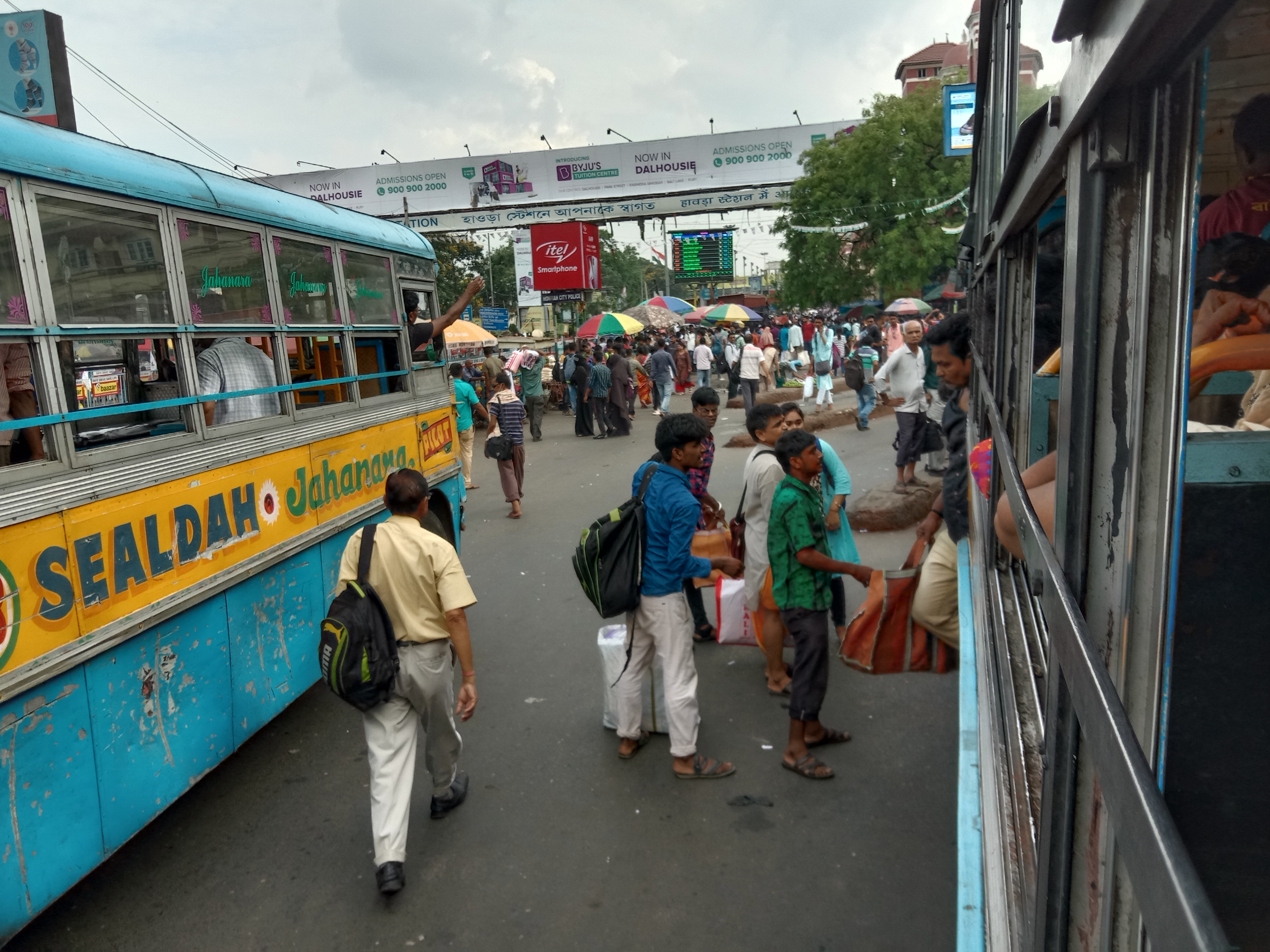
Public buses near Howrah Railway Station in Kolkata, West Bengal

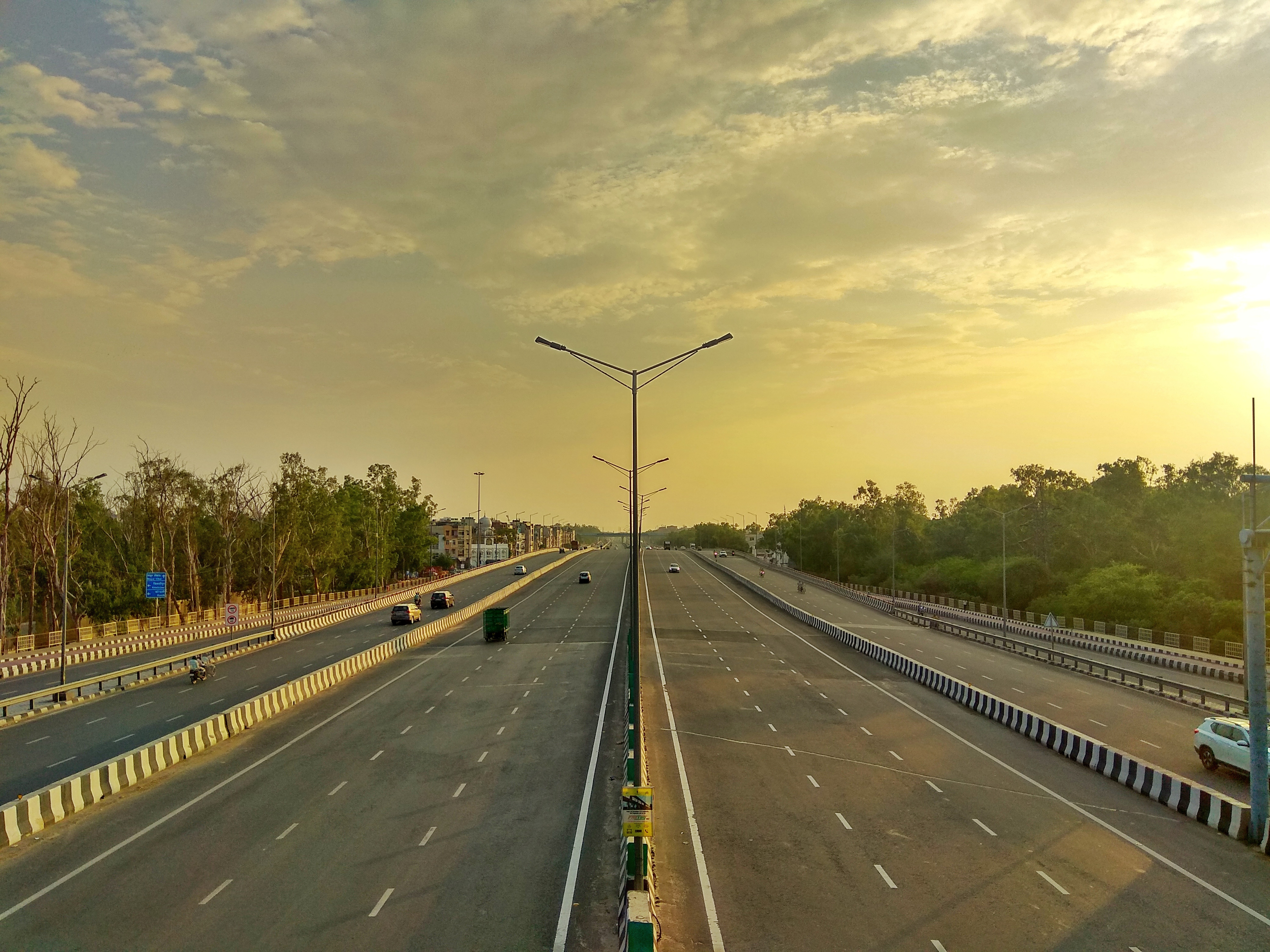
Delhi–Meerut Expressway is India's widest expressway with 14 lanes.

== Road ==
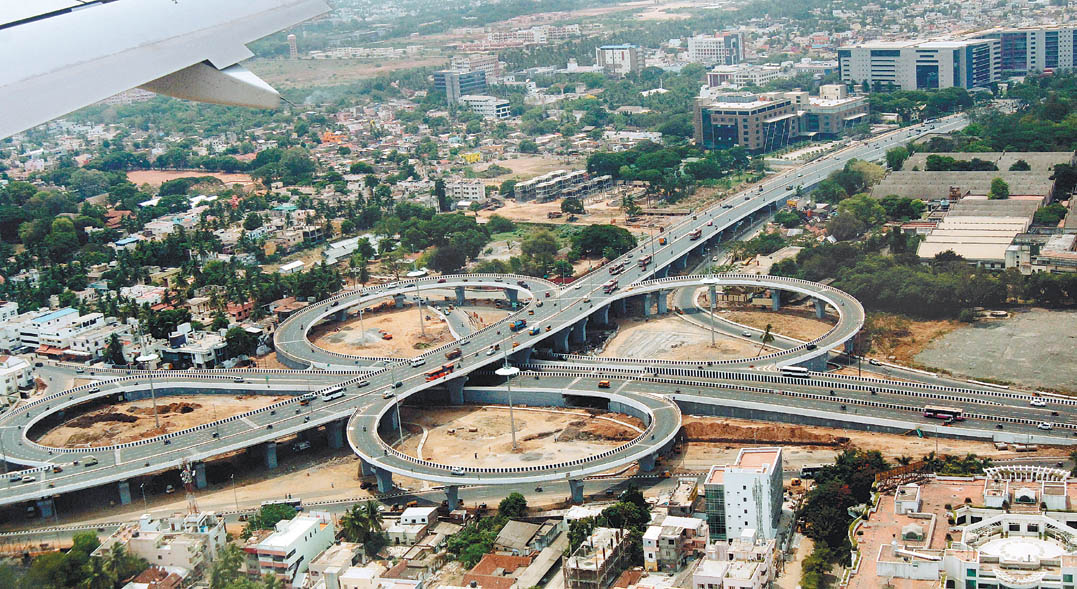
Kathipara Junction, Chennai

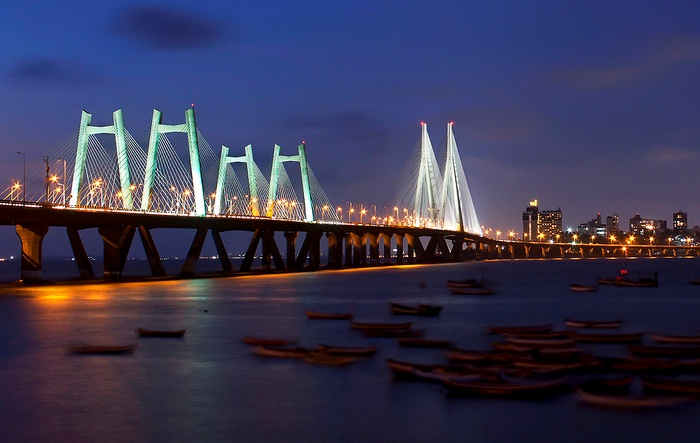
Bandra-Worli Bridge in Mumbai

As per 2024 estimates, the total road length in India is 6,700,000 km (4,200,000 mi); making the Indian road network the largest road network in the world. At 0.66 km of highway per square kilometre of land the density of India's highway network is higher than that of the United States (0.65) and far higher than that of China's (0.16) or Brazil's (0.20).

India has a network of National Highways connecting all the major cities and state capitals, forming the economic backbone of the country. As of 2013, India has a total of 161,350 km (100,258 mi) of National Highways, of which 6,059 km (3,765 mi) are classified as expressways. Although India has large network of four or more lane highways of international quality standards, but without access control (entry/exit control), they are not called as expressways but simply highways.

As per the National Highways Authority of India, about 66% of freight and 82% passenger traffic is carried by the roads. The National Highways carry about 40% of total road traffic, though only about 2% of the road network is covered by these roads. Average growth of the number of vehicles has been around 10.16% per annum over recent years.

India also has many bridges and flyovers in major cities to reduce traffic congestion. Some notable projects include Bandra–Worli Sea link in Mumbai and Kathipara Cloverleaf Interchange in Chennai. India's metropolitan intra-city average traffic vehicle speed in Delhi was 25 km/h (16 mph), in Mumbai 20.7 km/h (12.9 mph), in Chennai 18.9 km/h (11.7 mph) and in Kolkata 19.2 km/h (11.9 mph), as per a study by Ola Cabs in 2017.

Under National Highways Development Project (NHDP), work is under progress to equip national highways with at least four lanes; there is also a plan to convert some stretches of these roads to six lanes. In recent years construction has commenced on a nationwide system of multi-lane highways, including the Golden Quadrilateral connecting the four important metro cities of India (Delhi–Kolkata–Chennai–Mumbai) and North–South and East–West Corridors which link the largest cities in India.

In 2000, around 40% of villages in India lacked access to all-weather roads and remained isolated during the monsoon season. To improve rural connectivity, Pradhan Mantri Gram Sadak Yojana (Prime Minister's Rural Road Program), a project funded by the Central Government with the help of the World Bank, was launched in 2000 to build all-weather roads to connect all habitations with a population of 500 or above (250 or above for hilly areas).

| Type of road | Length |
|---|---|
| Expressways | 6,059 km (3,765 mi) as of 2024 |
| National Highways | 161,350 km (100,260 mi) |
| State Highways | 186,528 km (115,903 mi) |
| District and rural roads | 5,167,665 km (3,211,038 mi) |
| Total Length | 6,700,000 km (4,200,000 mi) (Approx) |

The Mumbai Trans Harbour Link is the longest sea bridge in India. It was inaugurated on 12 January 2024, by Prime Minister Narendra Modi. It connects Mumbai with Navi Mumbai.

=== Bus ===
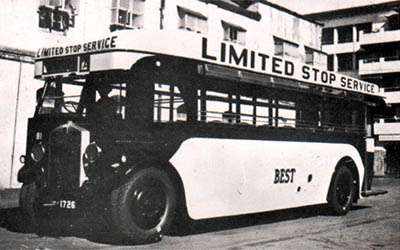
Mumbai's B.E.S.T. is India's oldest operating transport body

Buses are an important means of public transport in India. Due to this social significance, urban bus transport is often owned and operated by public agencies, and most state governments operate bus services through a state road transport corporation. These corporations have proven extremely useful in connecting villages and towns across the country. However, a majority of smaller cities still lack a public bus system. Only 63 out of 458 Indian cities with populations exceeding 1 lakh have established formal city bus networks.

Alongside the public companies there are many private bus fleets: As of 2020, there were about 150,000 publicly owned buses in India, and around 2,190,000 buses owned by private companies.

However, the share of buses is negligible in most Indian cities as compared to private vehicles, and two-wheelers and cars account for more than 80 percent of the vehicle population in most large cities.

==== Bus rapid transit systems ====
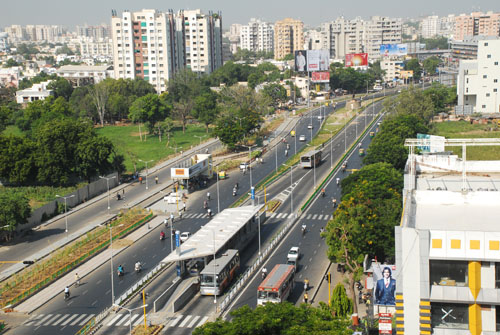
Ahmedabad BRTS

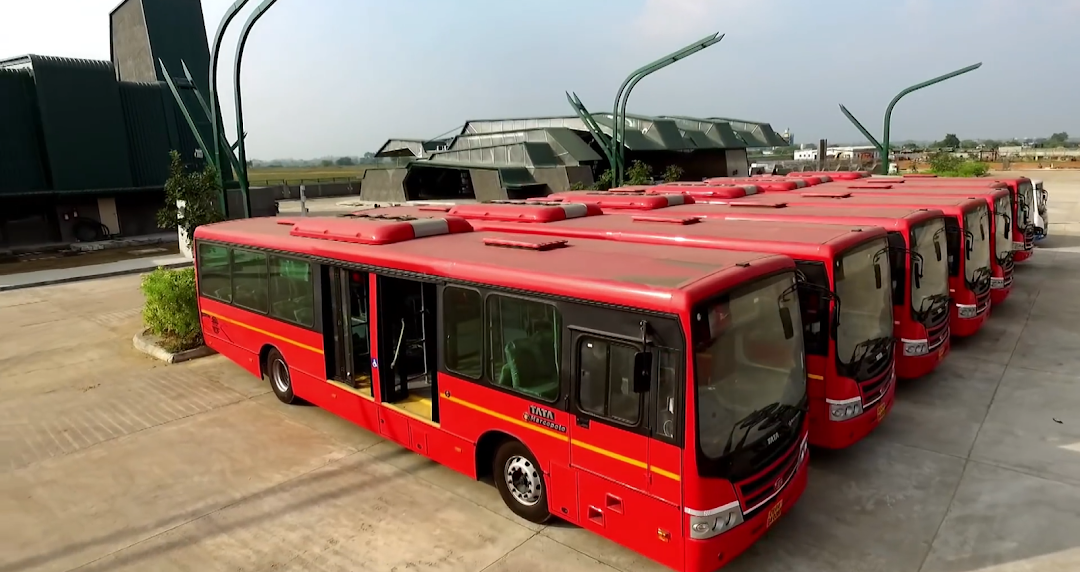
Raipur and Naya Raipur Bus Rapid Transit System

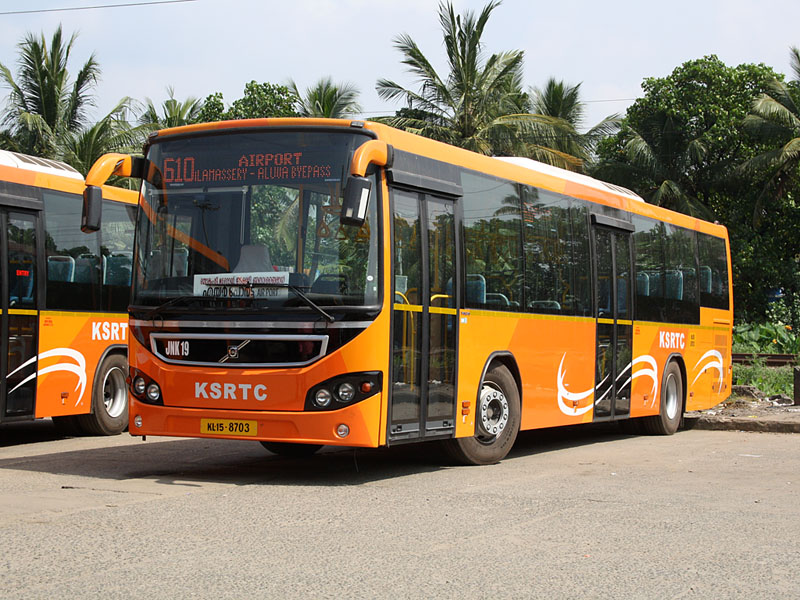
A KSRTC Volvo low-floor bus. Such buses were procured by STUs across the country under the JNNURM scheme.

Bus rapid transit systems (BRTS), exist in several cities. Buses take up over 90% of public transport in Indian cities, and serve as an important mode of transport. Services are mostly run by state government owned transport corporations. Since the 1990s, government state transport corporations across the country have introduced various facilities like low-floor buses for the disabled and air-conditioned buses to attract private car owners to help decongest roads.

In 2010, the Ahmedabad Bus Rapid Transit System won the prestigious Sustainable Transport Award from the Transportation Research Board in Washington. Rainbow BRTS in Pune is the first BRTS system in the country. Mumbai introduced air conditioned buses in 1998. Bangalore was the first city in India to introduce Volvo B7RLE intra-city buses in India in January 2005. Bangalore was the first Indian city to have an air-conditioned bus stop, located near Cubbon Park. It was built by Airtel. The city of Chennai houses one of Asia's largest bus terminus, the Chennai Mofussil Bus Terminus.

=== Motor vehicles ===
==== Two-wheelers ====
Motorised two-wheeler vehicles like scooters, motorcycles and mopeds are very popular due to their fuel efficiency and ease of use in congested roads or streets. The number of two-wheelers sold is several times to that of cars. There were 47.5 million powered two-wheelers in India in 2003 compared with just 8.6 million cars.

Manufacture of motorcycles in India started when Royal Enfield began assembly in its plant in Chennai in 1948. Royal Enfield, an iconic brand name in the country, manufactures different variants of the British Bullet motorcycle which is a classic motorcycle that is still in production. Hero MotoCorp (formerly Hero Honda), Honda, Bajaj Auto, Yamaha, TVS Motors and Mahindra 2 Wheelers are the largest two-wheeler companies in terms of market-share.

Manufacture of scooters in India started when Automobile Products of India (API) set up at Mumbai and incorporated in 1949. They began assembling Innocenti-built Lambretta scooters in India. They eventually acquired a licence for the Li150 series model, of which they began full-fledged production from the early 1960s onwards. In 1972, Scooters India Limited (SIL), a state-run enterprise based in Lucknow, Uttar Pradesh, bought the entire manufacturing rights of the last Innocenti Lambretta model. API has infrastructural facilities at Mumbai, Aurangabad, and Chennai, but has been non-operational since 2002. SIL stopped producing scooters in 1998.

Motorcycles and scooters can be rented in many cities, Wicked Ride, Metro Bikes and many other companies are working with state governments to solve last-mile connectivity problems with mass-transit. Wearing protective headgear is mandatory for both the rider and the pillion-rider in most cities.

==== Automobiles ====
Private automobiles account for 30% of the total transport demand in urban areas of India. An average of 1,800 new vehicles are registered every day in Delhi alone. The number of automobiles produced in India rose from 6.3 million in 2002–2003 to 11 million (11.2 million) in 2008–2009 and 28.4 million in 2023-2024. There is substantial variation among cities and states in terms of dependence on private cars: Bangalore, Chennai, Delhi and Kolkata have 185, 127, 157 and 140 cars per 1,000 people respectively, which is much lower compared to developed countries. This reflects different levels of urban density and varied qualities of public transport infrastructure. Nationwide, India still has a very low rate of car ownership. When comparing car ownership between BRICS developing countries, it is on a par with China, and exceeded by Brazil and Russia.

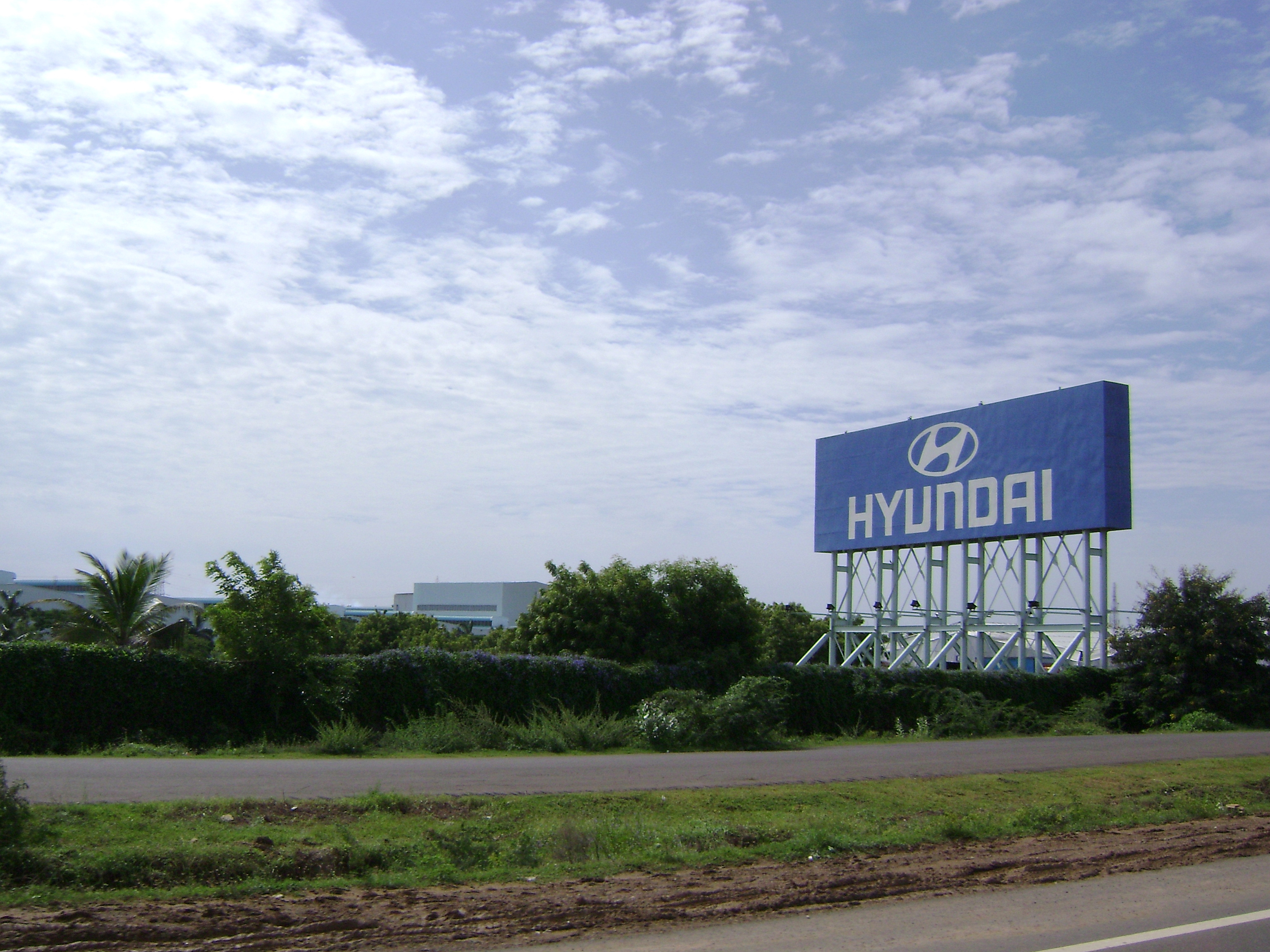
Hyundai's manufacturing plant at Sriperumbudur, Chennai, Tamil Nadu

Compact cars, especially hatchbacks and compact SUVs predominate due to affordability, fuel efficiency, congestion, and lack of parking space in most cities. Chennai is known as the "Detroit of India" for its automobile industry.

Maruti Suzuki, Tata Motors, Mahindra, and Hyundai are the most popular brands in the order of their market share. The Ambassador once had a monopoly, but is now an icon of pre-liberalisation India. The Maruti 800 launched in 1984, created the first revolution in the Indian auto sector because of its low price and high quality. It had the highest market share until 2004, when it was overtaken by other low-cost models from Maruti such as the Alto and the Wagon R, the Indica from Tata Motors and the Santro from Hyundai. Over the 20 years since its introduction, about 2.4 million Maruti 800s were sold. However, with the launch of the Tata Nano, the least expensive production car in the world, the Maruti 800 lost its popularity. India is also known for a variety of indigenous vehicles made in villages out of simple motors and vehicle spare parts. A few of these innovations are the jugaad, maruta, chhakda, and the peter rehra.

In the city of Bangalore, Radio One and the Bangalore Traffic Police, launched a carpooling drive which has involved celebrities such as Robin Uthappa, and Rahul Dravid encouraging the public to carpool. The initiative got a good response, and by the end of May 2009, 10,000 people are said to have carpooled in the city. There have been efforts to improve the energy efficiency of transport systems in Indian cities, including by introducing performance standards for private automobiles or by banning particularly polluting older cars. The city of Kolkata, for example, passed a law in 2009/10 phasing out vehicles over 15 years old with the purpose of reducing air pollution. However, the effects were mixed. On the one hand, poorer urban residents are more likely to see public health improvements from better air quality, since they are more likely to live in polluted areas and work outdoors than richer urban residents. On the other hand, drivers of such vehicles suffered from losing their livelihoods as a result of this environmental regulation.

==== Utility vehicles ====
The first utility vehicle in India was manufactured by Mahindra. It was a copy of the original Willys Jeep and was manufactured under licence. The vehicle was an instant hit and made Mahindra one of the top companies in India. The Indian Army and police extensively use Mahindra vehicles along with Maruti Gypsys for transporting personnel and equipment. Tata Motors, the automobile manufacturing arm of the Tata Group, launched its first utility vehicle, the Tata Sumo, in 1994. The Sumo, owing to its then-modern design, captured a 31% share of the market within two years. Until recently, the Tempo Trax from Force Motors was popular in rural areas. Sports utility vehicles now form a sizeable part of the passenger vehicle market. Models from Tata, Honda, Hyundai, Toyota and other brands are available in the market.

=== Taxis ===
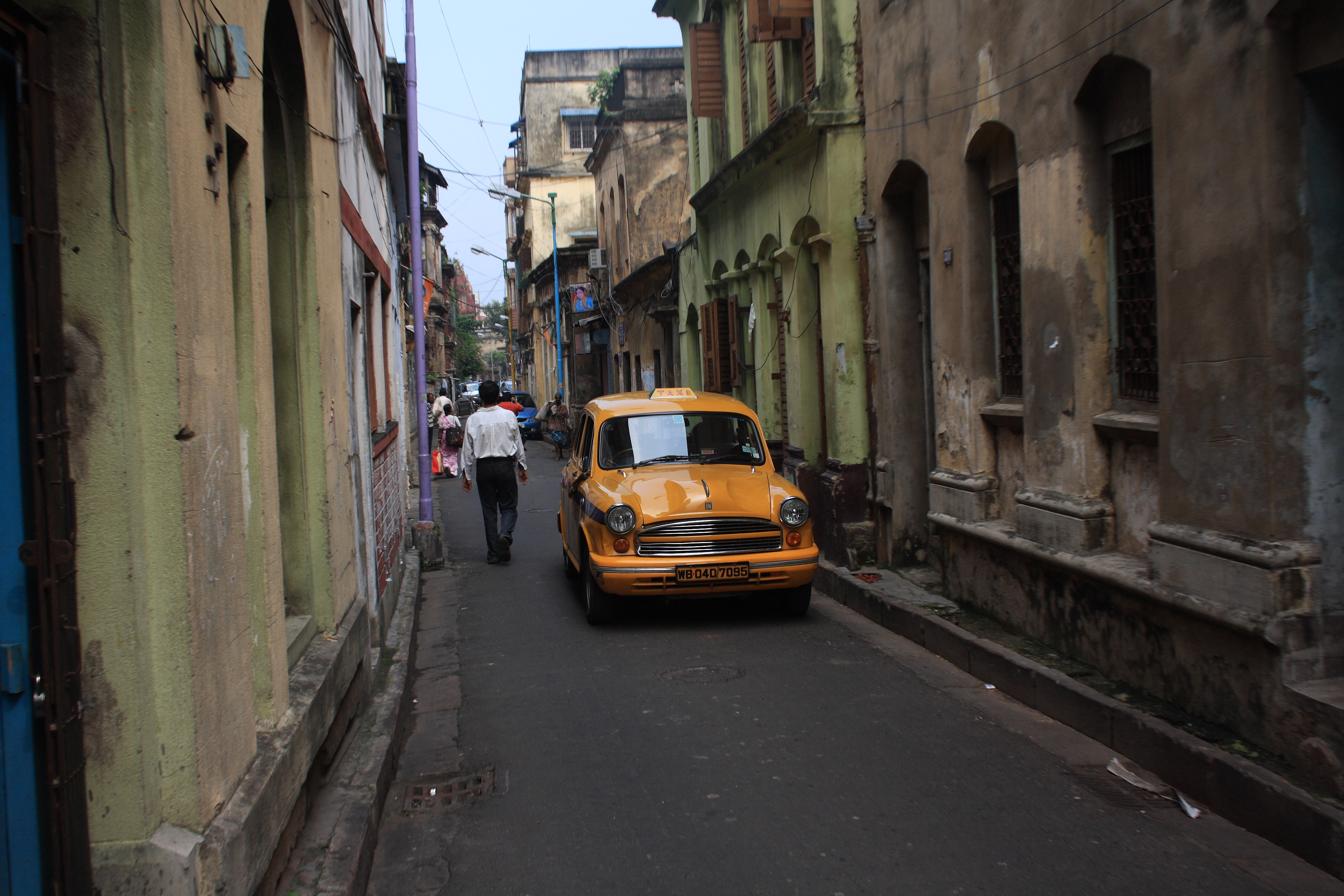
An old Hindustan Ambassador taxi in Kolkata

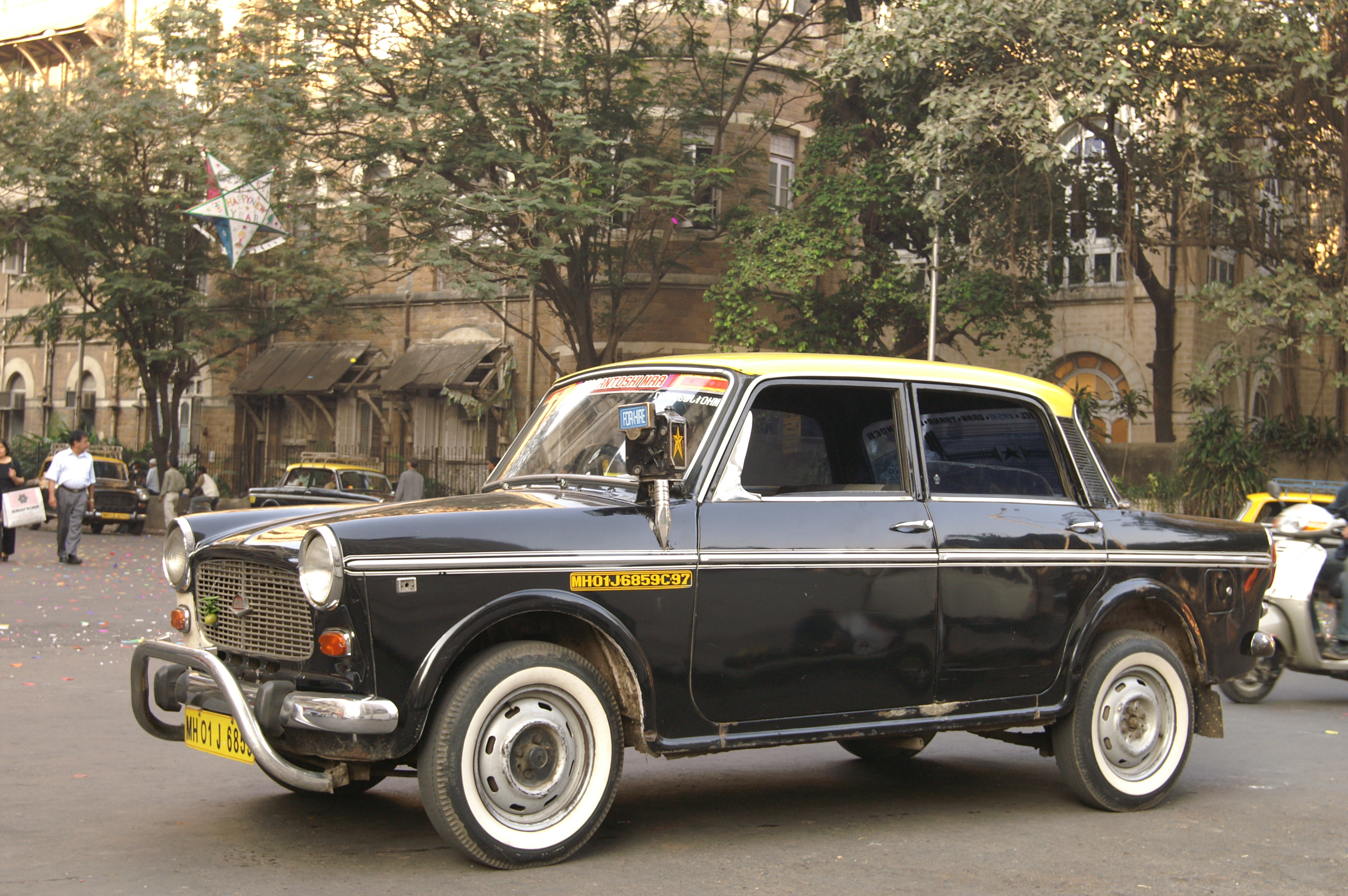
An old Premier Padmini taxi in Mumbai

Taxicabs in Mumbai and Kolkata were traditionally either Premier Padmini or Hindustan Ambassador cars. Currently, taxi fleets consist of more modern cars such as the Suzuki Dzire and Suzuki Ertiga. In recent years, taxi fleets in India have become more diverse, and taxicabs now include sedans, SUVs and even motorcycle taxis. Depending on the city/state, taxis can either be hailed or hired from taxi-stands. In cities such as Bengaluru, Chennai, Hyderabad and Ahmedabad, taxis need to be hired over phone, whereas in cities like Kolkata and Mumbai, taxis can also be hailed on the street. According to Government of India regulations, all taxis are required to have a fare-meter installed. There are additional surcharges for luggage, late-night rides and toll taxes are to be paid by the passenger. In recent years, online app-based cabs have become increasingly popular with the public due to reasons of safety and convenience.

In cities and localities where taxis are expensive or do not charge as per the government or municipal regulated fares, people use share taxis. These are normal taxis which carry one or more passengers travelling to destinations either on one route to the final destination, or near the final destination. The passengers are charged according to the number of people with different destinations. The city of Mumbai became the first city in India to have an "in-taxi" magazine, titled MumBaee, which was issued to taxis which are part of the Mumbai Taximen's Union. The magazine debuted on 13 July 2009. In Kolkata, there are many no refusal taxis available which are white and blue in colour.

=== Auto ===
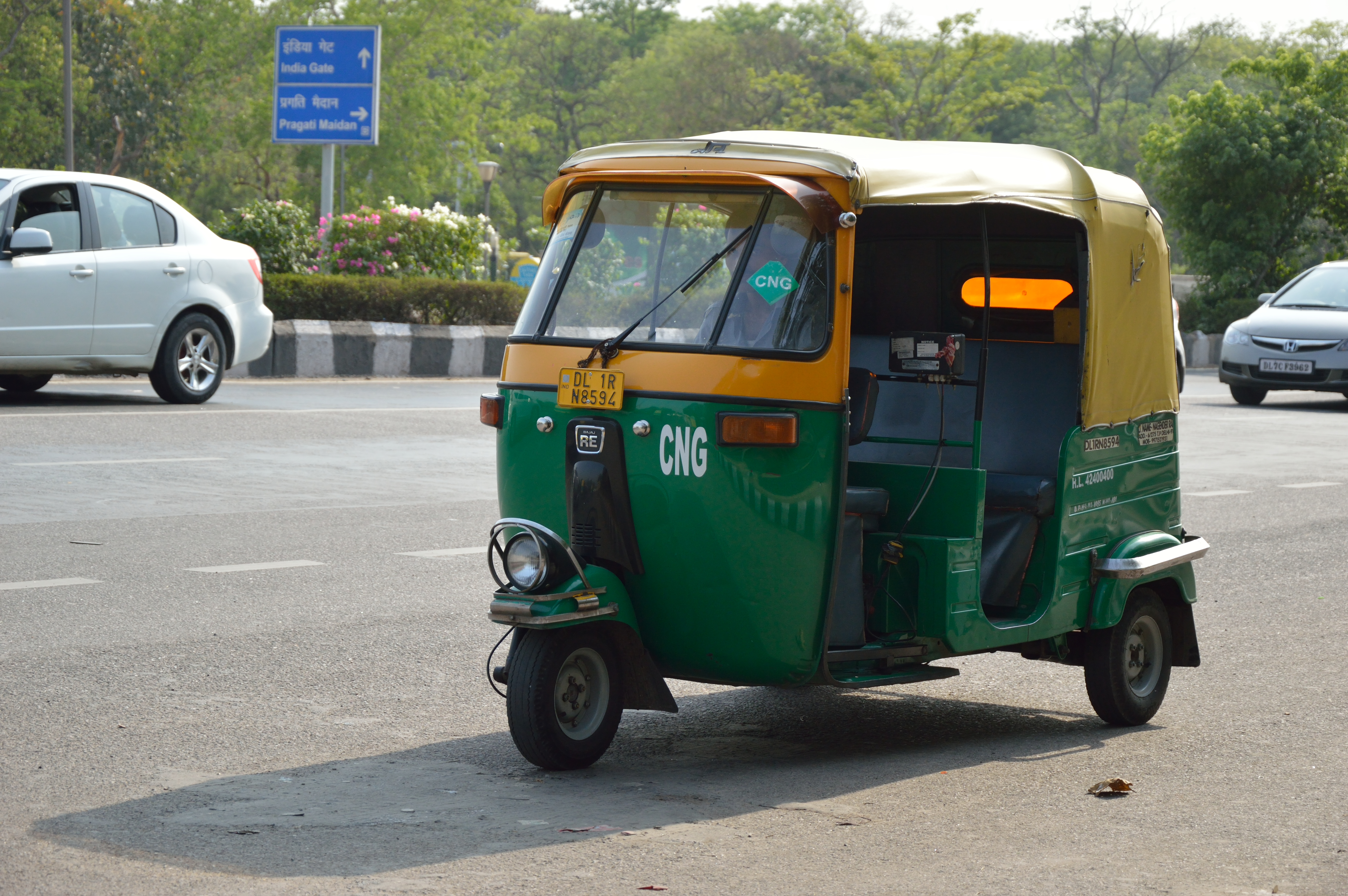
An LPG auto rickshaw in Delhi, India

An auto is a three-wheeler vehicle for hire that does not have doors and is generally characterised by a small cabin for the driver in the front and a seat for passengers in the rear. Generally it is painted in yellow, green or black and has a black, yellow or green canopy on the top, but designs vary considerably from place to place. The colour of the auto rickshaw is also determined by the fuel that it is powered by, for example Agartala, Ahmedabad, Mumbai, Pune and Delhi have green or black autos indicating the use of compressed natural gas, whereas the autos of Kolkata, Bengaluru, Hyderabad have green autos indicating the use of LPG.

In Mumbai and other metropolitan cities, 'autos' or 'rickshaws', as they are popularly known, usually have regulated metered fares. A recent law prohibits auto rickshaw drivers from charging more than the specified fare, or charging night-fare before midnight, and also prohibits the driver from refusing to go to a particular location. Mumbai and Kolkata are also the only two cities, which prohibit auto rickshaws from entering certain parts of the city, these cases being South Mumbai and certain parts of Downtown Kolkata. However, in cities like Chennai and other areas, some autorickshaw drivers demand more than the specified fare and refuse to use the fare meter.

Airports and railway stations at many cities such as Howrah, Chennai and Bengaluru provide a facility of prepaid auto booths, which requires a fixed payment, with a base fare of Rs. 30 and a rate of Rs.14.20 per kilometre after 1.5 kilometres of travel, set by the authorities as of May 2022. The fare to be paid by the passenger is calculated on this basis.

Electric rickshaw is a new popular means of transport, rapidly growing in number and popularity in India, due to low running and initial cost, and other economic and environmental benefits. E-Rickshaws are made in fibreglass or metal body, powered by a BLDC Electric Motor with max power 2000W and speed 25 km/h. They are usually painted white and blue though some E-autos use the conventional colour scheme as well.

=== Intermediate or last-mile transport ===
As per a report by CPPR, "Intermediate Public Transport (IPT), also known as para-transit or feeder service, refers to vehicles that work as a supplement to the public transport system by providing first and last mile connectivity to commuters. In urban and suburban areas, they commonly take the form of autorickshaws, cycle rickshaws, taxis, mini buses and more recently e-rickshaws. Jeeps, chakdas and kadukas (usually tractor or jeep chassis fitted with a trailer) provide feeder services in rural areas, connecting villages to the nearest towns. If the public transport system forms the skeleton of the framework, feeder services are its veins and capillaries."

IPT fills gaps in public transport and addresses deficiencies, catering to excess demand and serving areas lacking public transport. Despite its crucial role, IPT has been overlooked in policy for decades, remaining largely unorganised and neglected by the central government while facing heavy state regulation to avoid competition with state-owned transport systems.

Public transport typically excludes informal services like autorickshaws, taxis, and minibuses, yet these play a vital role in cities where formal systems are lacking. "In larger cities with more than one crore population, the major share of transport is served by formal systems like the bus, metro and suburban rail (refer table below). In medium sized cities with population less than one crore, IPT modes like autorickshaws are almost equal to the formal bus system. In smaller cities, with less than 10 lakh population, the share of IPTs is almost three times that of the formal bus system."

The high prevalence of two-wheelers in small cities highlights the inadequacy of both formal and informal transport. Comparing the number of informal transport options to city buses per one lakh population in Indian cities reveals that informal transport is often equal to or surpasses city buses, indicating heavy reliance on informal transport due to its demand-responsive nature compared to fixed-route city buses.

== Rail ==
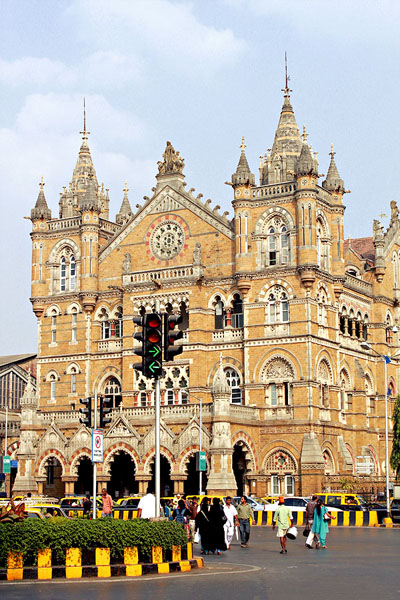
Chhatrapati Shivaji Maharaj railway station entrance

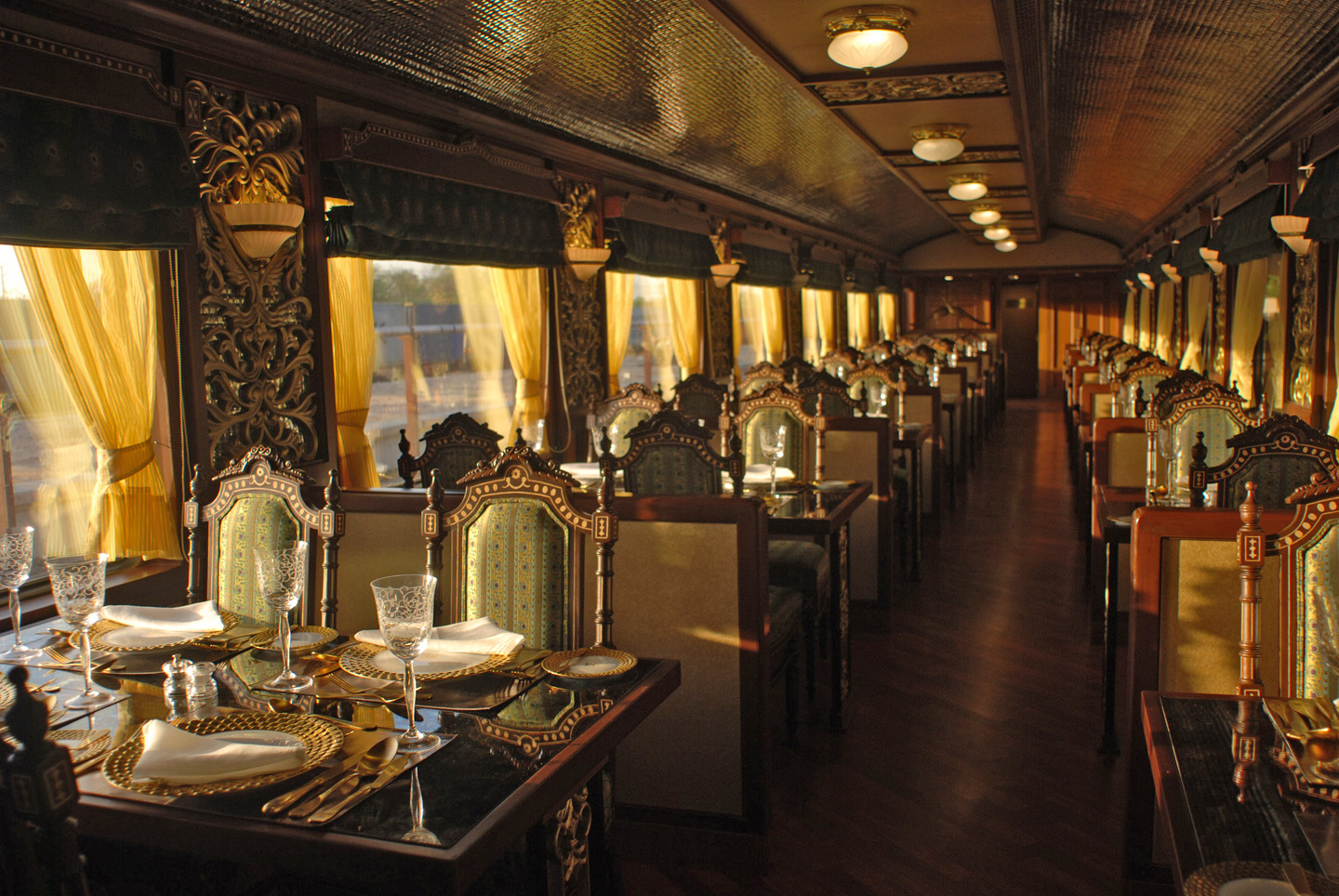
The dining saloon of the luxurious Maharajas' Express.

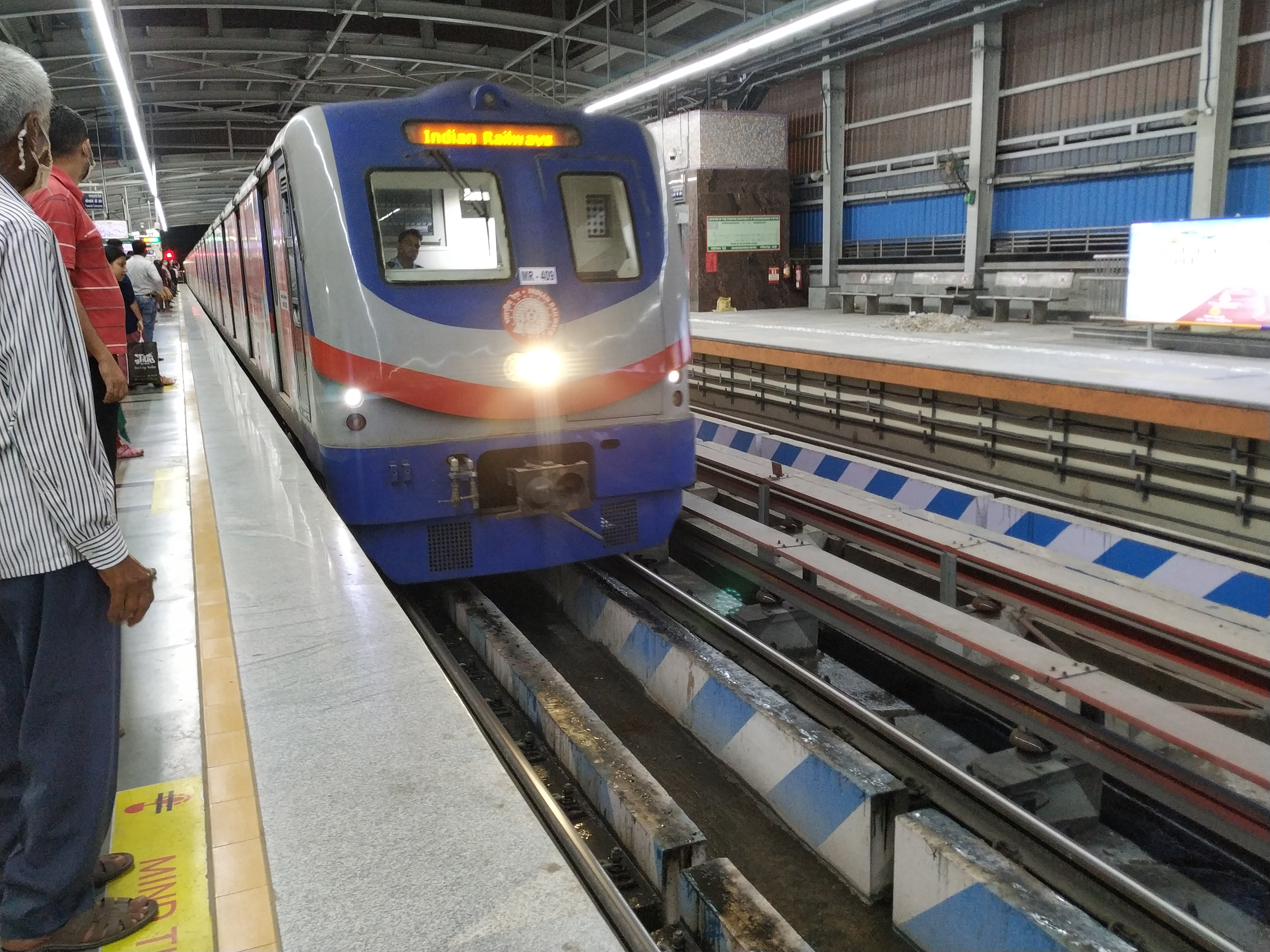
Kolkata Metro is the only metro system in India to be controlled by Indian Railways.

Country-wide rail services in India are provided by the state-run Indian Railways (IR) under the supervision of the Ministry of Railways. IR is divided into eighteen zones including the Kolkata Metro Railway. The IR are further sub-divided into sixty seven divisions, each having a divisional headquarters.

The railway network travels across the country, covering more than 7,325 stations over a total route length of more than 68,080 km (42,300 mi) and track length of about 132,310 km (82,210 mi) as of March 2021. About 45,000 km (28,000 mi) or 97% of the route-kilometre was electrified as of 2025. IR provides an important mode of transport in India, transporting 23.1 million passengers and 3.3 million tons of freight daily as of March 2019. IR is the world's ninth-largest employer, it had 1.227 million employees as of March 2019. As to rolling stock, IR owns over 289,185 (freight) wagons, 74,003 coaches and 12,147 locomotives as of March 2019. It also owns locomotive and coach production facilities. It operates both long distance and suburban rail systems.

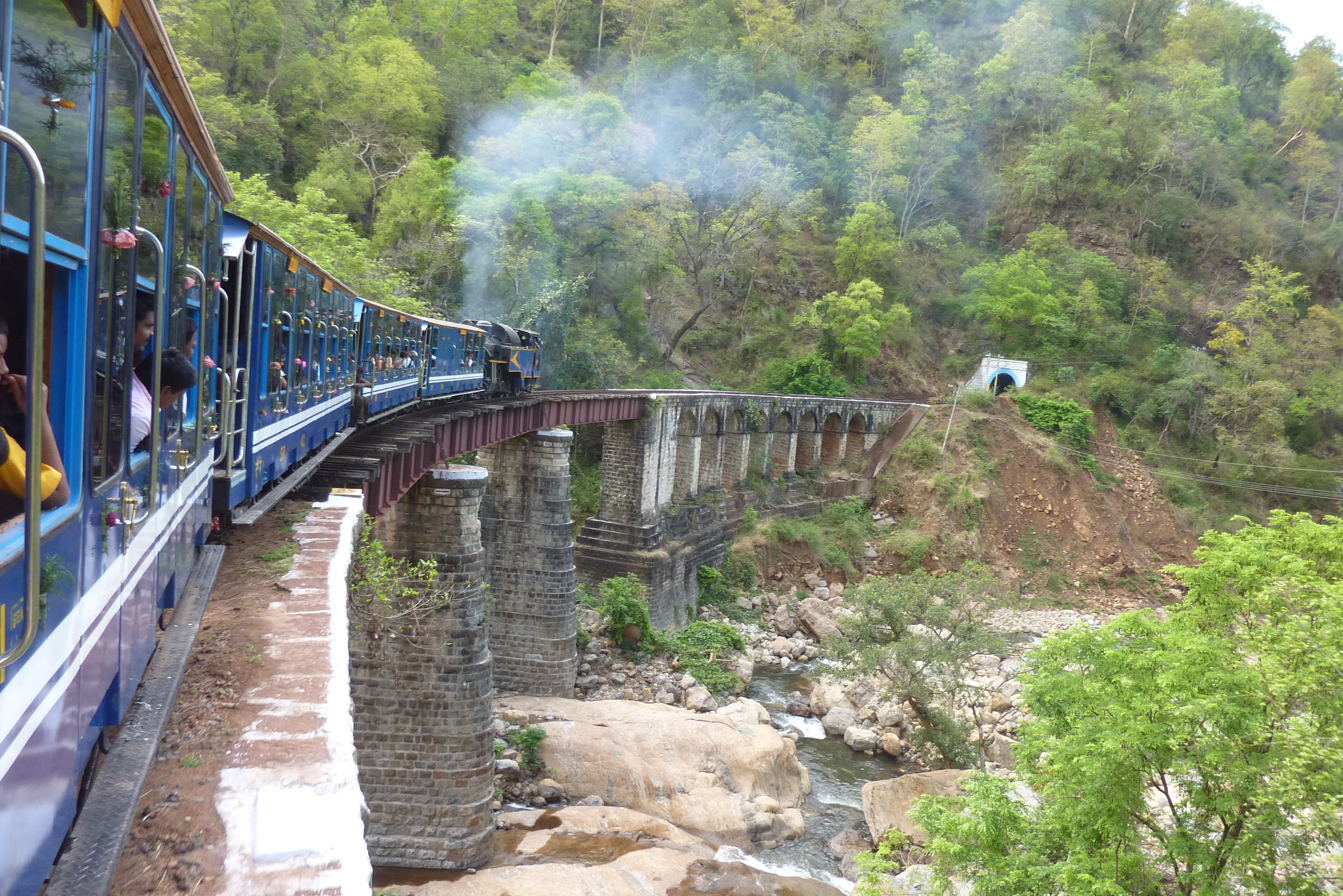
A steam locomotive operated by Nilgiris Mountain Railways between Coonoor and Ooty in the Nilgiris district of Tamil Nadu.

The IR runs a number of special types of services which are given higher priority. The fastest train at present is the Vande Bharat Express with design speeds of up to 180 km/h, though the fastest service is Gatiman Express with an operational speed of 160 km/h (99 mph) and average speed of 100 km/h (62 mph), since the Vande Bharat Express is capped at 130 km/h for safety reasons. The Rajdhani trains introduced in 1969 provides connectivity between the national capital, Delhi and capitals of the states. On the other hand, Shatabdi Express provides connectivity between centres of tourism, pilgrimage or business. The Shatabdi Express trains run over short to medium distances and do not have sleepers while the Rajdhani Expresses run over longer distances and have only sleeping accommodation. Both series of trains have a maximum permissible speed of 110 to 140 km/h (68 to 87 mph) but average speed of less than 100 km/h..The Duronto Express trains provide connectivity between large cities. Besides, the IR also operates a number of luxury trains which cater to various tourist circuits. For instance, the Palace on Wheels serves the Rajasthan circuit and The Golden Chariot serves the Karnataka and Goa circuits. There are two UNESCO World Heritage Sites on IR, the Chhatrapati Shivaji Maharaj Terminus and the Mountain railways of India. The latter consists of three separate railway lines located in different parts of India, the Darjeeling Himalayan Railway, a 610 mm (2 ft) narrow-gauge railway in Lesser Himalayas in West Bengal, the Nilgiri Mountain Railway, a 1,000 mm (3 ft 3 3/8 in) metre gauge rack railway in the Nilgiri Hills in Tamil Nadu and the Kalka-Shimla Railway, a 762 mm (2 ft 6 in) narrow-gauge railway in the Sivalik Hills in Himachal Pradesh.

In the freight segment, IR ferries various commodities and fuels in industrial, consumer, and agricultural segments across the length and breadth of India. IR has historically subsidised the passenger segment with income from the freight business. As a result, freight services are unable to compete with other modes of transport on both cost and speed of delivery, leading to continuous erosion of market share. To counter this downward trend, IR has started new initiatives in freight segments including upgrading of existing goods sheds, attracting private capital to build multi-commodity multi-modal logistics terminals, changing container sizes, operating time-tabled freight trains, and tweaking with the freight pricing/product mix.

In 1999, the Konkan Railway Corporation introduced the Roll on Roll off (RORO) service, a unique road-rail synergy system, on the section between Kolad in Maharashtra and Verna in Goa, which was extended up to Surathkal in Karnataka in 2004. The RORO service, the first of its kind in India, allowed trucks to be transported on flatbed trailers. It was highly popular, carrying about 110,000 trucks and bringing in about ₹ 740 million worth of earnings to the corporation until 2007.

Perhaps the game-changer for IR in the freight segment are the new dedicated freight corridors that are expected to be completed by 2020. When fully implemented, the new corridors, spanning around 3300 km, could support hauling of trains up to 1.5 km in length with 32.5-ton axle-load at speeds of 100 kilometres per hour (62 mph). Also, they will free-up capacity on dense passenger routes and will allow IR to run more trains at higher speeds. Additional corridors are being planned to augment the freight infrastructure in the country.

=== Commuter rail transport ===
In many Indian metropolitan regions, rail is the more efficient and affordable mode of public transport for daily commute. Examples of types of services include long-established local or suburban rail services in cities such as Mumbai, Kolkata and Chennai, the century-old tram service in Kolkata, the more recent metro service in Kolkata, Delhi and Chennai and Monorail feeder service in Mumbai.

==== Suburban rail ====
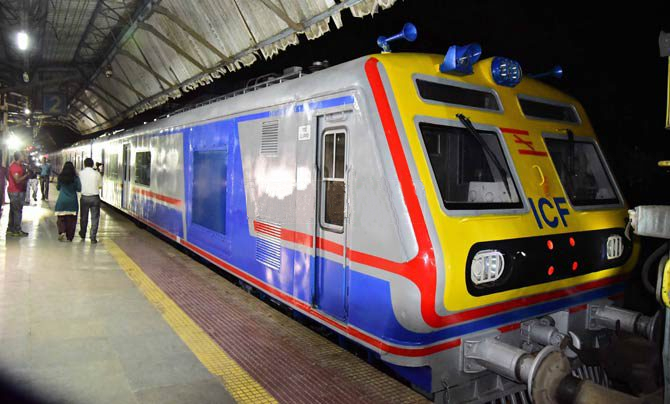
Mumbai suburban rail.

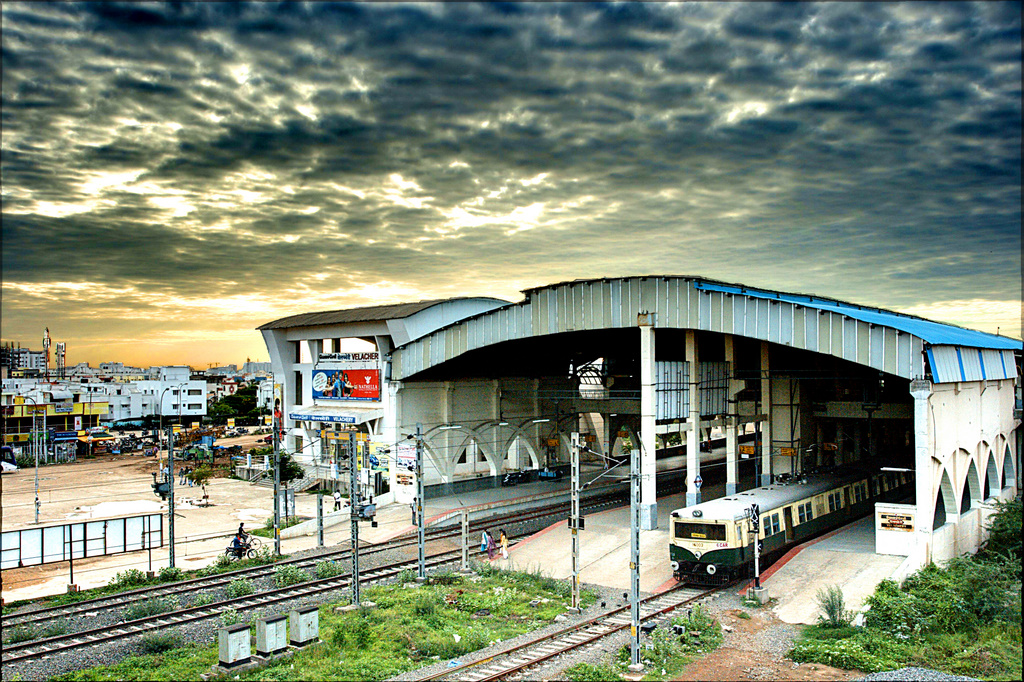
The Chennai MRTS and Chennai Suburban, the first elevated railway in India.

The Mumbai Suburban Railway was the first rail system in India, which began its services in Mumbai in 1853, transporting 6.3 million passengers daily and has the highest passenger density in the world. The Kolkata Suburban Railway was established in 1854, and the Chennai Suburban Railway in 1931. The operational suburban rail systems in India are in Mumbai Suburban Railway, Kolkata Suburban Railway, Chennai Suburban Railway, Lucknow-Kanpur Suburban Railway, Delhi Suburban Railway, Pune Suburban Railway, Hyderabad Multi-Modal Transport System, Barabanki-Lucknow Suburban Railway and Karwar railway division. The planned systems are Bengaluru Suburban Railway, Ahmedabad Suburban Railway and Coimbatore Suburban Railway.

==== Mass rapid transit system ====
The Chennai MRTS, which began services in 1995, remains the country's first and only mass rapid transit rail. Although distinct from the Chennai Suburban Railway, the MRTS remains integrated in a wider urban rail network.

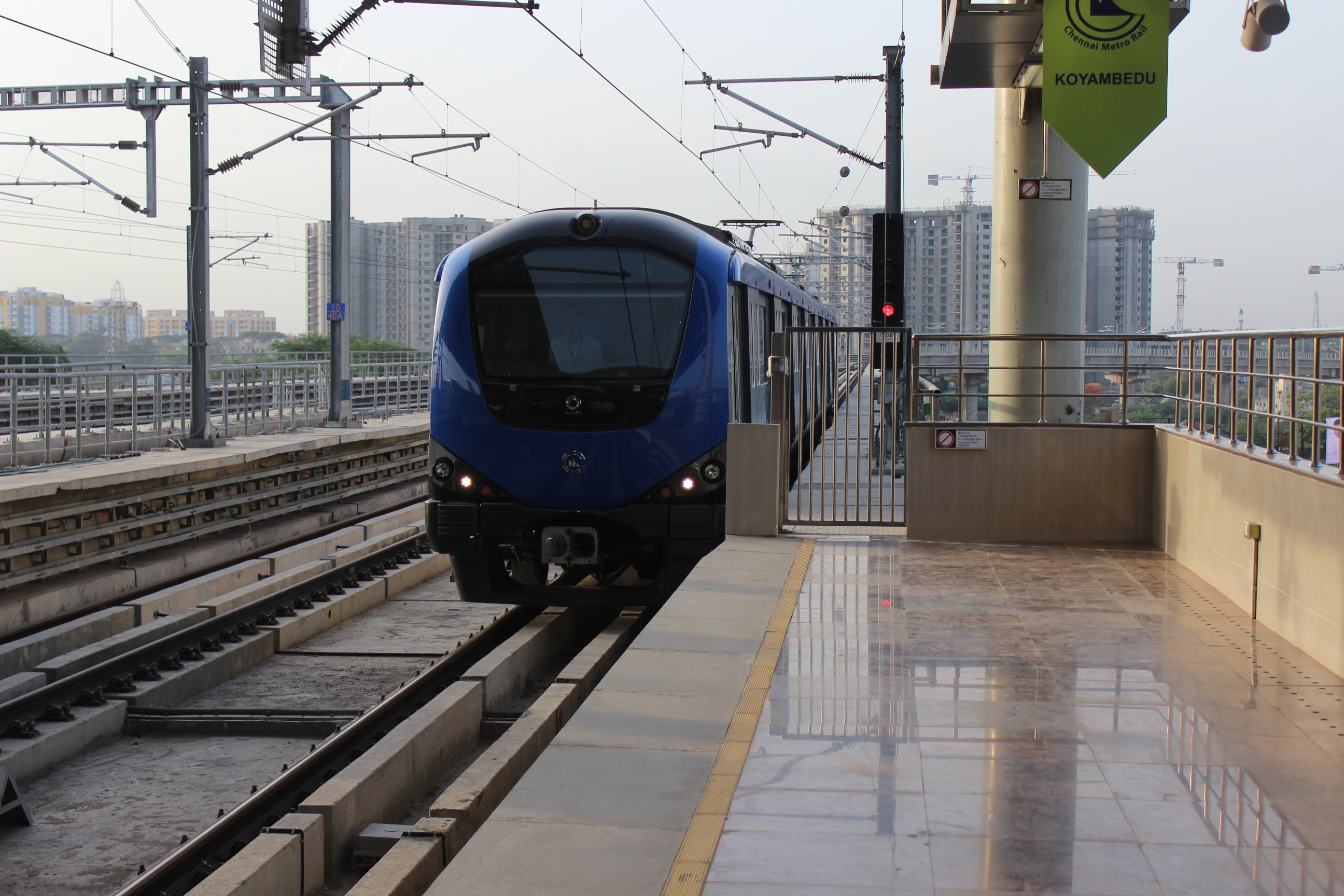
Chennai Metro

==== Metro ====
The first modern rapid transit in India is the Kolkata Metro which started its operations in 1984 as the 17th Zone of the Indian Railways. The Delhi Metro in New Delhi is India's second conventional metro and began operations in 2002. The Namma Metro in Bengaluru began operations in 2011 as India's third operational rapid transit system.

The operational systems are Kolkata Metro, Delhi Metro, Bengaluru Metro, Gurgaon Metro, Mumbai Metro, Jaipur Metro, Chennai Metro, Kochi Metro, Lucknow Metro, Nagpur Metro, Noida Metro, Hyderabad Metro, Kanpur Metro, Ahmedabad Metro, Pune Metro, Navi Mumbai Metro, Agra Metro, Meerut Metro, Bhopal Metro, Indore Metro and Patna Metro.

The under implementation systems are Varanasi Metro, Madurai Metro, Vijayawada Metro, Guwahati Metro, Chandigarh Metro, Kozhikode Metro, Thiruvananthapuram Metro, Coimbatore Metro, Visakhapatnam Metro, Surat Metro, Jammu Metro, Srinagar Metro, Greater Gwalior Metro, Jabalpur Metro and Greater Nashik Metro. India now operates over 900 km of metro rail across more than 15 cities, making it the third-largest urban rapid transit network in the world, after China and the United States. With over 900 km more under active construction or approved, India is witnessing one of the fastest metro rail expansions globally, reflecting the country's commitment to modern, sustainable urban transport.

==== Monorail ====
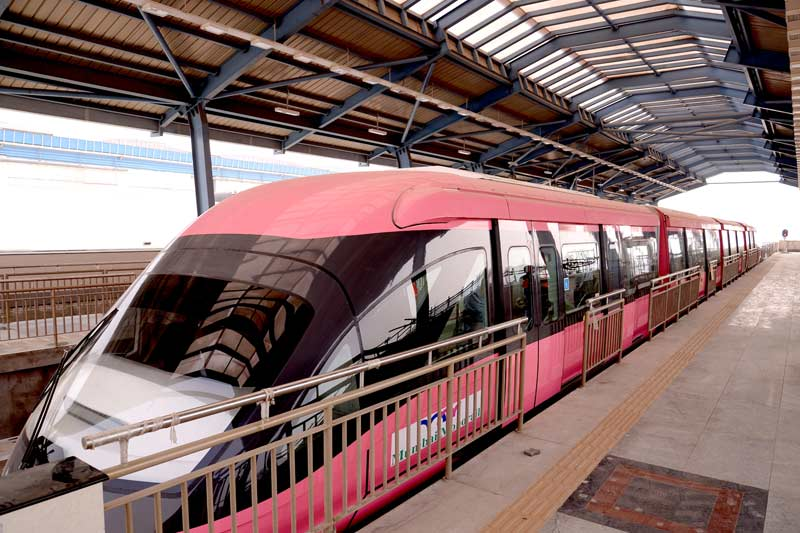
A monorail in Mumbai

Monorail is generally considered as a feeder system for metro trains in India. In 2004, monorail was first proposed for Kolkata. But, later the idea was put on hold due to lack of funds and infeasibility. The Mumbai Monorail, which started in 2014, is the first and only operational monorail network in India (excluding the Skybus Metro) since the Patiala State Monorail Trainways closed in 1927.

Monorail systems were also planned in Chennai, Kolkata, Allahabad, Bengaluru, Delhi, Indore, Kanpur, Navi Mumbai, Patna, Pune, Ahmedabad, Aizawl, Bhubaneswar, Jodhpur, Kota, Nagpur and Nashik.

==== Tram ====
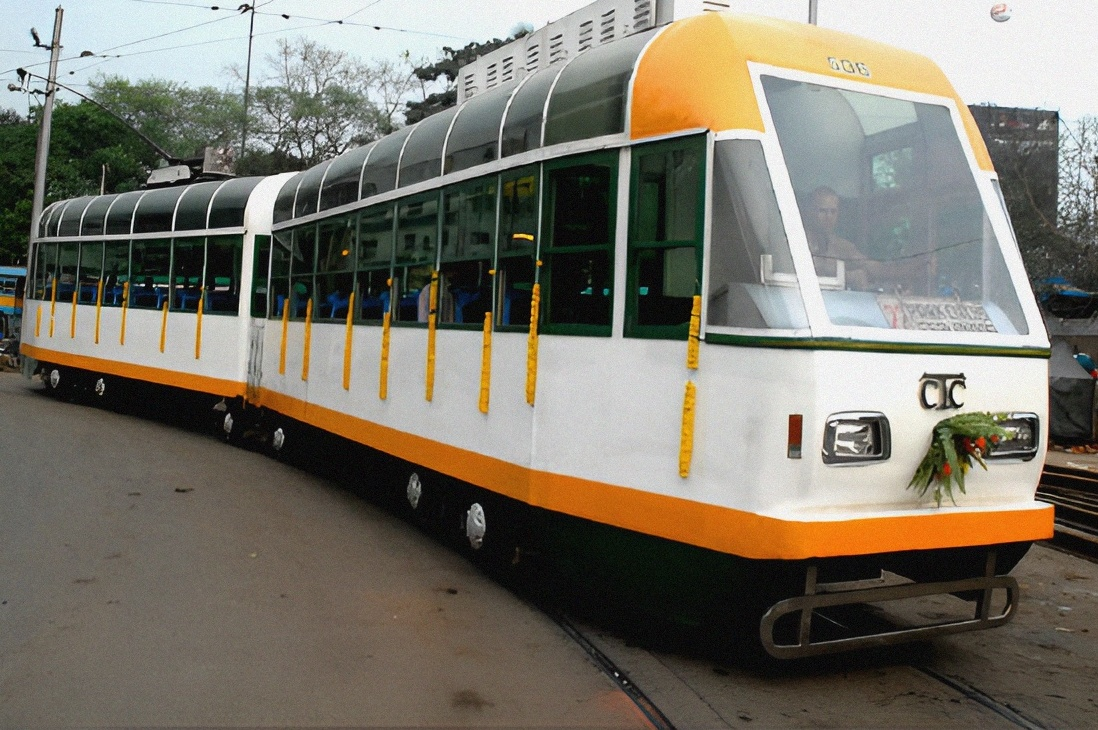
New fibreglass made tram

In addition to trains, trams were introduced in many cities in the late 19th century, though almost all of these have been phased out. The trams in Kolkata is currently the only tram system in the country.

=== International links ===
Rail links between India and neighbouring countries are not well-developed. Bangladesh is connected by a biweekly train, the Maitree Express that runs from Kolkata to Dhaka and a weekly train, the Bandhan Express that runs from Kolkata to Khulna. Two rail links to Nepal exist—passenger services between Jaynagar and Bijalpura, and freight services between Raxaul and Birganj.

No rail link exists with Myanmar but a railway line is to be built through from Jiribam (in Manipur) to Tamu through Imphal and Moreh. The construction of this missing link, as per the feasibility study conducted by the Ministry of External Affairs through RITES Ltd, is estimated to cost ₹29.41 billion (US$310 million). An 18 km railway link with Bhutan is being constructed from Hashimara in West Bengal to Toribari in Bhutan. No rail link exists with either China or Sri Lanka.

=== High-speed rail ===
India does not have any railways classified as high-speed rail (HSR), which have operational speeds in excess of 200 km/h (120 mph).

Prior to the 2014 general election, the major national parties (Indian National Congress and Bharatiya Janata Party) pledged to introduce high-speed rail. The INC pledged to connect "all of India's million-plus cities by high-speed rail." Later, the BJP, which won the election, promised to build the Diamond Quadrilateral project, which would connect the cities of Chennai, Delhi, Kolkata, and Mumbai via high-speed rail. This project was approved as a priority for the new government in the incoming prime minister's speech. Construction of one kilometre of high speed railway track will cost ₹1 billion (US$11 million) – ₹1.4 billion (US$15 million), which is 10–14 times higher than the construction of standard railway. Indian government approved the choice of Japan to build India's first high-speed railway. The planned rail would run some 500 km (310 mi) between Mumbai and the western city of Ahmedabad, at a top speed of 320 km/h (200 mph). Under the proposal, construction was expected to begin in 2017 and be completed in 2023. It would cost about ₹980 billion (US$10 billion) and be financed by a low-interest loan from Japan. India will use the wheel-based 300 km/h HSR technology, instead of new maglev 600 km/h technology of Japan used in Chūō Shinkansen. India is expected to have its first HSR line operational from 2027 onwards.

=== Hyperloop ===
See hyperloop in India.

=== Light rail ===
Like monorail, light rail is also considered as a feeder system for the metro systems. The planned systems are Kolkata Light Rail Transit and Delhi Light Rail Transit.

=== Funicular Railway ===
India’s longest funicular railway — a 1.2 km cable-hauled rail line near Kalyan in Thane district, Maharashtra (outskirts of the Mumbai Metropolitan Region) — has been inaugurated after years of planning and construction, replacing a strenuous multi-hour uphill climb with a 7–10 minute ride and significantly improving access up the slope; the system can carry about 120 passengers per trip and is expected to boost convenience, safety and visitor numbers in the area.

== Space transport ==
Indian Human Spaceflight Programme's Gaganyaan is being developed as India's first crewed spaceship.

== Water ==
India has a coastline of 7,517 km (4,671 mi), and thus ports are the main centres of trade. India also has an extensive network of inland waterways.

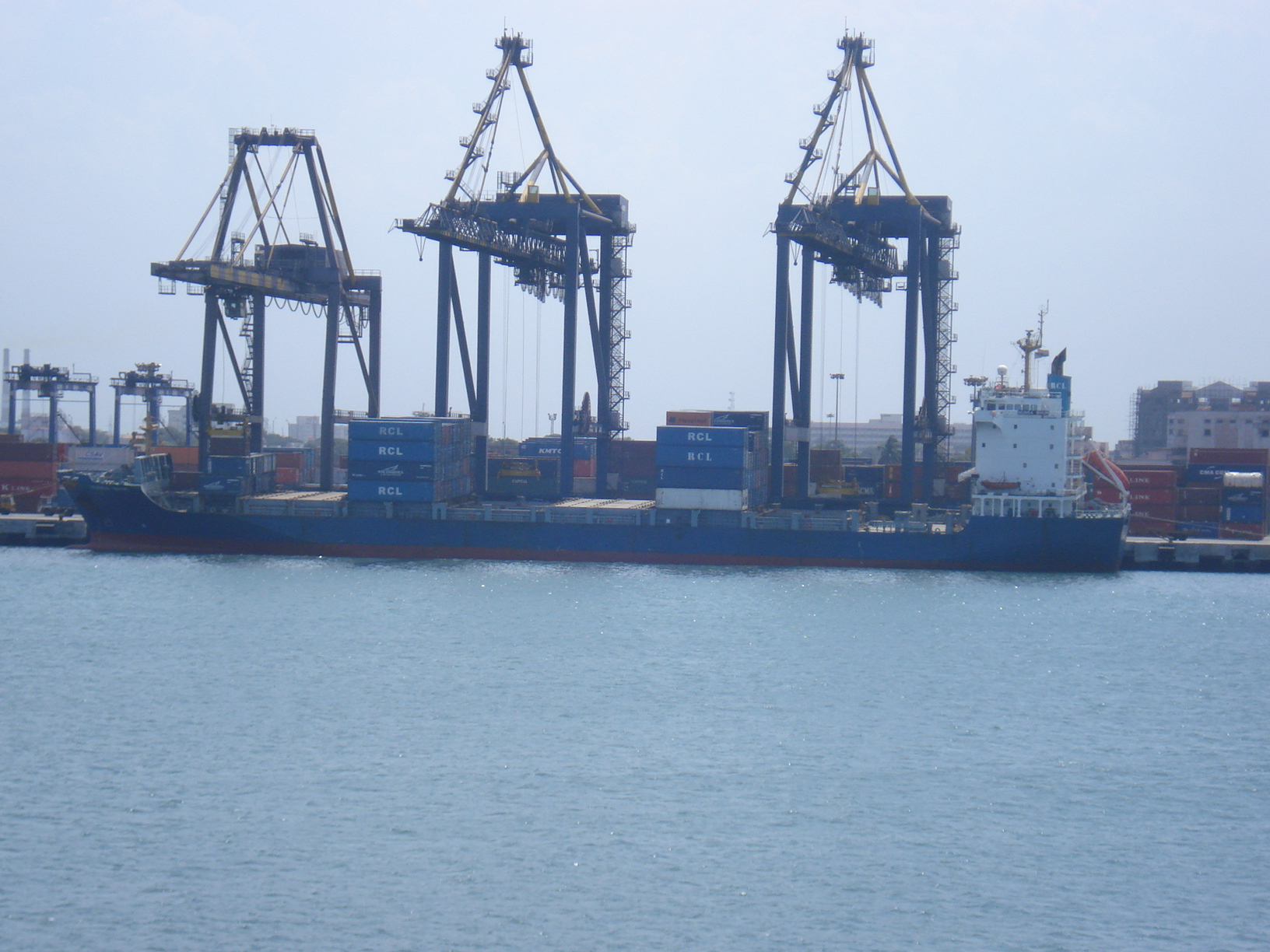
Chennai Port is the largest container port in the Bay of Bengal.

=== Ports and shipping ===
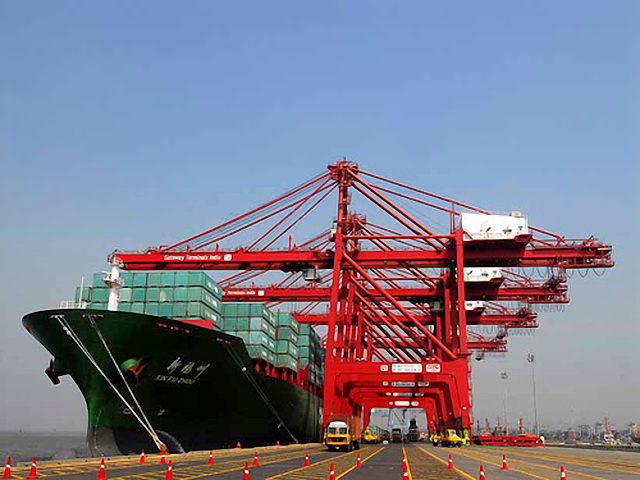
Jawaharlal Nehru Port Trust in Navi Mumbai ranks 25th in the world as per container traffic.

In India, about 96% of the foreign trade by quantity and 70% by value takes place through the ports. Mumbai Port & JNPT(Navi Mumbai) handles 70% of maritime trade in India. There are twelve major ports:Navi Mumbai, Mumbai, Chennai, Ennore, Thoothukudi, Kochi, Kolkata (including Haldia), Paradip, Visakhapatnam, New Mangaluru, Mormugao and Kandla. Other than these, there are 187 minor and intermediate ports, 43 of which handle cargo.

Maritime transportation in India is managed by the Shipping Corporation of India, a government-owned company that also manages offshore and other marine transport infrastructure in the country. It owns and operates about 35% of Indian tonnage and operates in practically all areas of shipping business servicing both national and international trades. The only Indian state with three ports is Tamil Nadu, they are Ennore, Chennai and Tuticorin.

It has a fleet of 79 ships of 2,750,000 GT (4.8 million DWT) and also manages 53 research, survey and support vessels of 120,000 GT (060,000 DWT) on behalf of various government departments and other organisations. Personnel are trained at the Maritime Training Institute in Mumbai, a branch of the World Maritime University, which was set up in 1987. The corporation also operates in Malta and Iran through joint ventures.

The distinction between major and minor ports is not based on the amount of cargo handled. The major ports are managed by port trusts which are regulated by the central government. They come under the purview of the Major Port Trusts Act, 1963. The minor ports are regulated by the respective state governments and many of these ports are private ports or captive ports. The total amount of traffic handled at the major ports in 2005–2006 was 382.33 Mt.

=== Inland Waterways ===
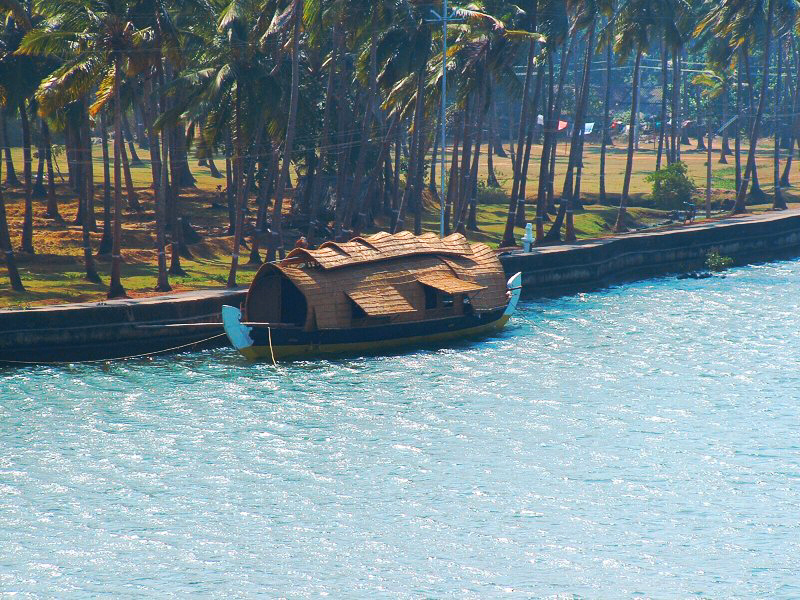
A parked vessel along the Chapora River in Goa.

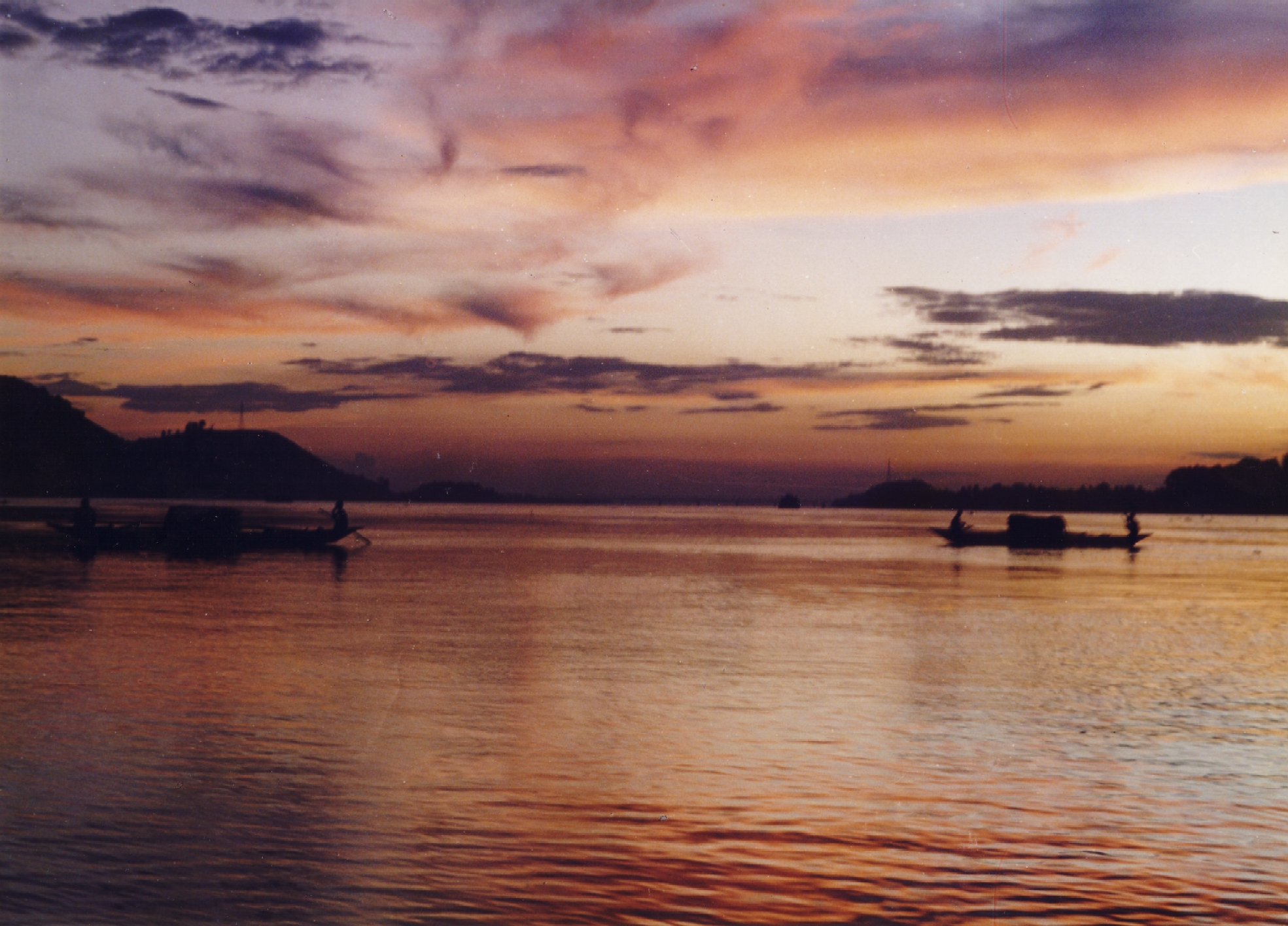
Boats sailing on National Waterway 2 at Guwahati

India has an extensive network of inland waterways in the form of rivers, canals, backwaters and creeks. The total navigable length is 14,500 kilometres (9,000 mi), out of which about 5,200 km (3,231 mi) of river and 485 km (301 mi) of canals can be used by mechanised crafts. Freight transport by waterways is highly underutilised in India compared to other large countries. The total cargo moved by inland waterways is just 0.15% of the total inland traffic in India, compared to the corresponding figures of 20% for Germany and 32% for Bangladesh.

Cargo that is transported in an organised manner is confined to a few waterways in Goa, West Bengal, Assam and Kerala. The Inland Waterways Authority of India (IWAI) is the statutory authority in charge of the waterways in India. It does the function of building the necessary infrastructure in these waterways, surveying the economic feasibility of new projects and also administration and regulation. The following waterways have been declared as National Waterways:

- National Waterway 1: Prayagraj–Haldia stretch of the Ganga – Bhagirathi – Hooghly River system with a total length of 1,620 kilometres (1,010 mi) on 27 October 1986.
- National Waterway 2: Saidiya–Dhubri stretch of the Brahmaputra River system with a total length of 891 kilometres (554 mi) in 26 Oct 1988.
- National Waterway 3: Kollam–Kottappuram stretch of the West Coast Canal along with Champakara and Udyogmandal canals, with a total length of 205 kilometres (127 mi) in 1 Feb 1991.
- National Waterway 4: Bhadrachalam–Rajahmundry and Wazirabad–Vijaywada stretch of the Krishna–Godavari river system along with the Kakinada–Puducherry canal network, with a total length of 1,095 km (680 mi) in 24 Nov 2008.
- National Waterway 5: Mangalgadi–Paradeep and Talcher–Dhamara stretch of the Mahanadi–Brahmani river system along with the East Coast Canal, with a total length of 623 km (387 mi) in 24 Nov 2008.

=== Deep Ocean Samudrayaan ===
Samudrayaan is India's deep ocean mission.

=== Seaplane ===
India will soon have around ten Seaplane in operation, which are expected to be deployed by private as well as public operators, global aerospace major De Havilland Canada.

At present, no seaplanes are operating in the country.

== Logistics ==
In fy2023-24, India's transport logistics cost 8% of gdp, and the cheapest per km logistics transport costs were railways (₹1.96/km), followed by waterways (₹2.30), road (₹3.78), and air (₹72).

Confederation of Indian Industry (CII) and government organises an annual national logistics convention. Major shippers include Container Corporation of India and Transport Corporation of India, and Logistics Management magazine is one of the industry publications.

=== Statistics ===
Logistics in India ranking moved up to 35th place in 2016 from 54th in 2014 on World Bank's Global Logistics Performance Index. Government strategy aims to raise the share of global trade in India's GDP (US$2.7 trillion in FY 2017–18) to 40%, including half of it (20% of GDP) from exports (c. Jan 2019). Cost of logistics in India is 14% of GDP, which is higher than the developed nations, and government reforms aim to bring it down to 10% of GDP by 2022 (c. Jan 2018). Ministry of Commerce and Industry has created a new dedicated centralised Logistics division in collaboration with Singapore and Japan to handle the logistics which was earlier handled by several different ministries, such as railways, roads, shipping and aviation. To boot exports, each state will have exports and logistic policy and Nodal officers will be appointed at district level (c. Jan 2018). There are 64 transactions and 37 government agencies in the end-to-end production-to-export process. To further improve the ranking, improve speed of logistics, ease of doing business and reduce the cost of logistics, India is creating a "common online integrated logistics e-marketplace portal" that will cover all transactions in production and export, connect buyers with logistics service providers and government agencies such as the customs department Icegate system, Port Community Systems, Sea and Air Port terminals, Shipping lines, Railways, etc. (c. Jan 2018).

=== Economic road corridors ===
See economic corridors of India.

=== Dedicated rail freight corridors ===
See Dedicated freight corridors in India.

=== Sagarmala: waterway logistics ===
As part of the US$125 billion port-led development project Sagarmala, the government will define the regulatory framework for the Indian logistics operational standards by India's 300 dry ports logistics parks (inland container depots or ICDs) to the top 10 logistics international best practices nations to boost exports, remove supply chain bottlenecks, reduce transaction costs, optimise logistics mix, set up new hub-and-spoke dry ports (c. January 2018). To reduce the logistics costs by 10% and CO_{2} emissions by 12%, the government is also developing 35 new "Multimodal Logistics Parks" (MMLPs) on 36 ring roads, which will facilitate 50% of the freight moved in India. Land has been earmarked and pre-feasibility studies are underway for six of these MMLPs (c. May 2017).

=== Logistics parks ===
See Multi-Modal Logistics Parks in India and list of logistics parks in India

== Other ==
=== Pipelines ===
Oil and gas industry in India imports 82% of its oil needs and aims to bring that down to 67% by 2022 by replacing it with local exploration, renewable energy and indigenous ethanol fuel (c. Jan 2018).

- Length of pipelines for crude oil is 20,000 km (12,427 mi).
- Length of Petroleum products pipeline is 15,000 kilometres (9,300 mi).

== International connectivity ==
- India's International connectivity projects
- India's Northeast Connectivity projects
- Asian Highway Network
- BIMSTEC projects
- Kaladan Multi-Modal Transit Transport Project
- India–Myanmar–Thailand Trilateral Highway
- India–Middle East–Europe Economic Corridor
- Mekong-Ganga Cooperation
- North-South Transport Corridor

== Modernisation ==
In 1998, the Supreme Court of India published a directive that specified the date of April 2001 as deadline to replace or convert all buses, three-wheelers and taxis in Delhi to compressed natural gas.

=== Biofuels ===
The Karnataka State Road Transport Corporation was the first state transport undertaking in India to utilise bio-fuels and ethanol-blended fuels. KSRTC took an initiative to do research in alternative fuel forms by experimenting with various alternatives — blending diesel with biofuels such as honge, palm, sunflower, groundnut, coconut and sesame. In 2009, the corporation decided to promote the use of biofuel buses.

=== Electric vehicles ===
In 2017, the government announced that by 2030, only electric vehicles would be sold in the country. It also announced that by 2022 all trains would be electric.

== See also ==
Rail

- Dedicated freight corridors in India
- Future of rail transport in India, rail development

Roads

- Bharatmala
  - Diamond Quadrilateral, subsumed in Bharatmala
  - Golden Quadrilateral, completed national road development connectivity older scheme
- India-China Border Roads, subsumed in Bharatmala
- Expressways of India
- Setu Bharatam, river road bridge development in India

Seaports and river transport

- List of national waterways in India
- Sagar Mala project, national water port development connectivity scheme

Air transport

- Guided missiles of India
- List of ISRO missions
- Indian Human Spaceflight Programme
- UDAN, national airport development connectivity scheme
- List of ISRO missions

General

- Traffic collisions in India
- Urban rail transit in India
- Aerial lift in India

=== Transport in Indian cities ===
- Transport in Kolkata
- Transport in Mumbai
- Transport in Delhi
- Transport in Mysore
- Transport in Chennai
- Transport in Bengaluru
