= Ahmedabad Suburban Railway =

Planned regional rail system in India

Overview
- Owner: Gujarat Infrastructure Development Board; Indian Railways
- Locale: Ahmedabad
- Transit type: Suburban rail
- Number of lines: 2 (planned)
- Number of stations: 41 (planned)
- Daily ridership: 4,55,000 (Estimated)
- Headquarters: Ahmedabad
- Website: gidb.gujarat.gov.in

Operation
- Operator: Western Railway zone
- Train length: 3 coaches
- Headway: 10 minutes

Technical
- System length: 52.96 km
- Track gauge: Broad gauge

Ahmedabad Suburban Railway is a proposed regional rail system in the city of Ahmedabad, Gujarat, India. It will consist of two corridors with frequent commuter services aiming to decongest road traffic and enhance connectivity between suburban and industrial areas.

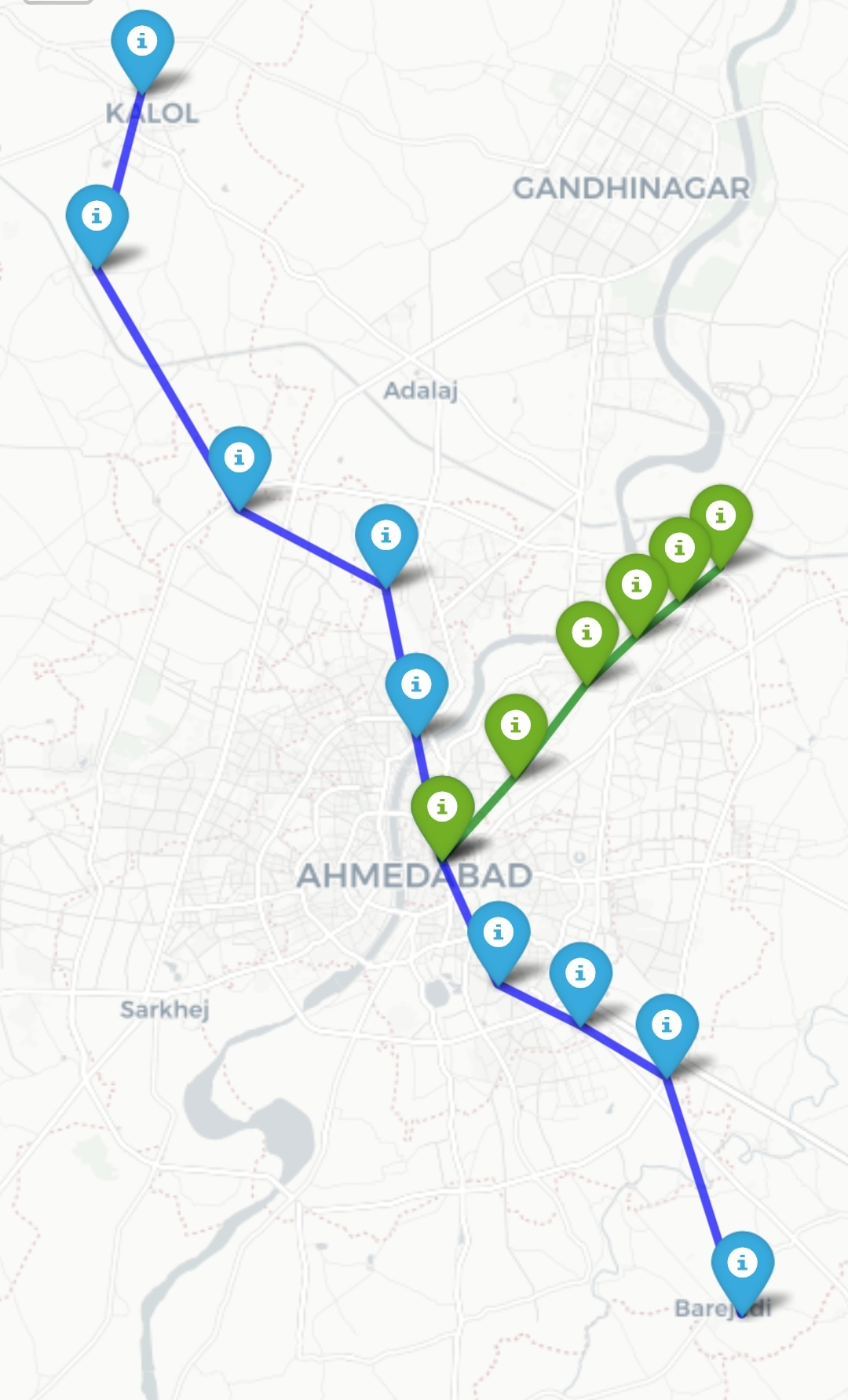

== History ==
The suburban railway was proposed to let people live in satellite towns and commute easily making less pressure on urban infrastructure. The project was conceptualised by the Delhi Metro Board around 2003. The Detailed Project Review was submitted to the Gujarat Infrastructure Development Board (GIDB) by Delhi Metro Rail Corporation in October 2005. GIDB sent it to RITES for verification. The project had received approval in 2009 but was not implemented. During Vibrant Gujarat Global Investors Summit 2015, MOU was signed with Rail Vikas Nigam Ltd for a suburban railway system in Ahmedabad. Later it was announced in 2016 Union Rail Budget. The project was revived in 2025, and fresh viability studies were proposed.

== Corridors ==
The project will use the existing Right of Way of Indian Railways, passing through Ahmedabad by upgrading and integrating existing facilities. Two corridors are planned for Ahmedabad Suburban Railway.

- Corridor 1: Barejadi – Ahmedabad Junction – Kalol (43.49 km), with stops at Geratpur, Vatva, Maninagar, Sabarmati, Chandkheda, Khodiyar, and Saij Sertha Road.
- Corridor 2: Ahmedabad Junction – Naroda (9.47 km), with stops at Asarva, Ahmedabad Airport, Saijpur, and Sardargram.

== See also ==
- Ahmedabad Metro
- Indian Railways
- Western Railway zone
