= Chandigarh Metro =

Rapid transit system in India

Coordinates: 30.709°N 76.801°E

Overview
- Locale: New Chandigarh; Chandigarh; Panchkula; Mohali; Zirakpur; Pinjore
- Transit type: Rapid transit
- Number of lines: 3 (Phase–I); 2 (Phase–II)
- Number of stations: 50+
- Daily ridership: 307,000 (estimated)

Operation
- Began operation: 2034; 8 years' time (Phase–I)
- Operator: Chandigarh Metro Rail Corporation (CMRC)
- Character: Underground and elevated
- Number of vehicles: 16
- Train length: 2 coaches

Technical
- System length: 154.5 km (96.0 mi) Phase–I: 91 km (57 mi); Phase–II: 63.5 km (39.5 mi)

Chandigarh Metro is an approved rapid transit system to serve the Chandigarh Tricity Area, which includes Chandigarh Tricity and adjacent areas in Punjab and Haryana states of India. In Phase-1, to be progressively built and operationalised between 2027 and 2034, 3 lines will connect tri-cities of Chandigarh, Mohali in Punjab and Panchkula in Haryana. Phase-2, to be constructed after 2034, will connect Pinjore in Haryana and further expand the network in Mohali with 2 more lines. The project, which was initially scrapped in 2017 due to low financial viability, was approved in March 2023 and received formal clearance in July 2024 from the governments of Punjab and Haryana after a Detailed Project Report (DPR) was created.

== History ==
The Delhi Metro Rail Corporation (DMRC), the agency operating and looking after Delhi Metro, submitted the Detailed Project Report (DPR) of the Chandigarh Metro Project to the former Governor of Punjab and administrator of Chandigarh, Shivraj Patil, on 16 August 2012.

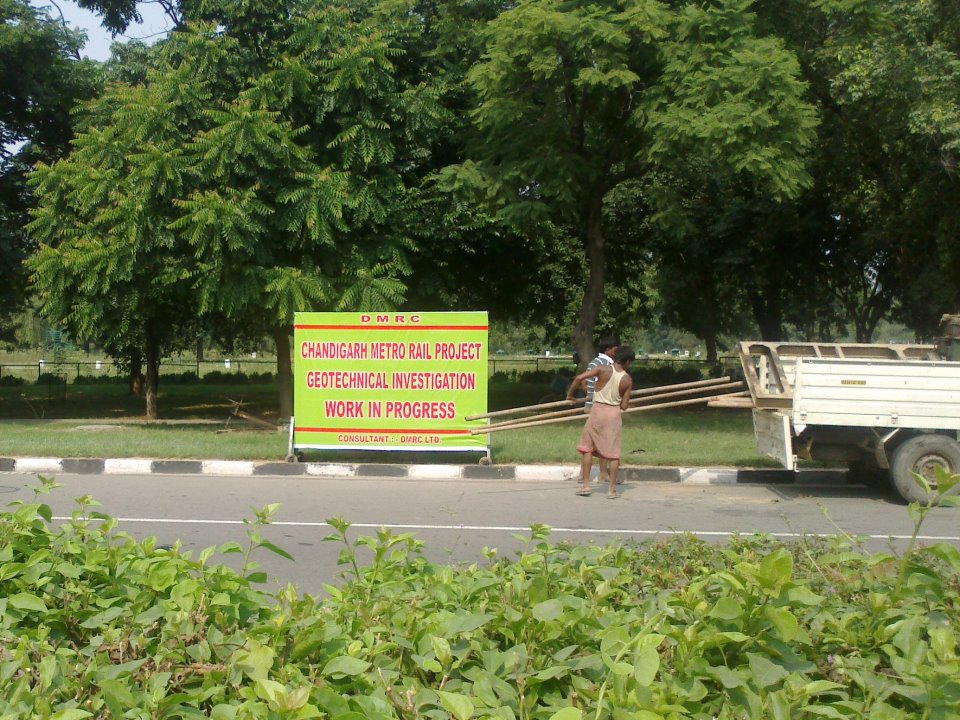
Soil testing procedure was conducted as part of the first plan

On 9 July 2015, in the presence of Kaptan Singh Solanki, the then the Governor of Punjab and administrator of Chandigarh, as well as the Governor of Haryana, a memorandum of understanding (MoU) was signed by the Additional Chief Secretary and the secretary of Haryana Town and Country Planning Department, P. Raghavendra Rao, the Secretary of Town and Planning, Punjab, A. Venu Prasad, and the Adviser of the Union Territory (UT), Vijay Kumar Dev. As part of the MoU, the three parties also created a special purpose vehicle (SPV) to execute the project as the Greater Chandigarh Transport Corporation (GCTC) for the development of comprehensive integrated multi-modal urban and suburban commuter system for the region. The initial equity of the GCTC shall be ₹ 100 crore, which would be contributed equally – 25 percent each – by the Ministry of Housing and Urban Affairs (MoHUA), the UT Administration, Haryana and Punjab.

The project was scrapped in 2017 due to low viability, and stated that the rapid transit system in the tri-city would not be viable at least until 2051. However, the project was revived in November 2022 when Rail India Technical and Economic Service (RITES) decided to re-plan the project and make it a reality in the forthcoming years, as the tri-city is having a combined population of around 3 million and is long facing traffic and frequent congestion, resulting in the increase in the number of accidents and other mishaps over time. It proposed to build a 64.5 km network connecting the three cities. In view of this, in March 2023, the project was given an in-principle approval by the Government of India. In July 2023, in a meeting of the governments of Punjab and Haryana and RITES, the project was cleared by the governments to progress after the detailed plan was created by RITES.

The plan includes to divide the project into two phases, out of which the first phase will be constructed between 2027 and 2037 (later replanned to 2034) and will consist of three lines connecting three cities, while the second phase will consist of another two lines and will be constructed after 2034. The first phase will be built at a cost of ₹ 10,570 crore.

== Lines ==
=== Phase 1 ===
In the first phase, the first of the three lines will connect various areas within Chandigarh, and the other two lines will connect the tri-cities with each other. The network will be 91 km (57 mi) long, which increased the previous plan of 77 km (48 mi) by more than 24 km. Out of the 77-km network, Chandigarh will have 35 km, Panchkula will have 11 km, and Mohali and New Chandigarh together will have 31 km of network. It will be progressively built and operationalised between 2027 and 2034 at a cost of ₹ 10,570 crore, to be funded by the governments of Punjab and Haryana (20 percent), the Government of India (20 percent) and the remaining 60 percent by a lending agency to be selected. Its Detailed Project Report (DPR) will be created by RITES, at a cost of ₹ 6.5 crore.

==== Line 1 ====
Line 1 will be 34 km (21 mi) long. It will connect ISBT Panchkula to Panchkula Extension, wherein the localities of Sultanpur (New Chandigarh), Kurali, Sarangpur, Khuda Lahora, PGI, Panjab University, Transport Light, Sector 26, Chandigarh railway station, Mauli Jagran Road, Housing Board Chowk, Geeta Chowk (Panchkula), ISBT Panchkula, Maheshpur road, Amartex road, Sector 20 Panchkula and Panchkula Extension Sector 28 (Madanpur) will have stations.

==== Line 2 ====
Line 2 will be 41 km (25 mi) long. It will connect Rock Garden and Sukhna Lake to ISBT Zirakpur via Industrial Area and Chandigarh Airport, wherein the localities of Rock Garden, Sukhna Lake, Sector 17 Chandigarh, ISBT Sector 43, Fountain Chowk, Himalaya Marg, Gurdwara Singh Shaheedan (Mohali), Jail Road Chowk, Airport Chowk and Aerocity NH-7 Junction and ISBT Zirakpur. The route will join the ISBTs of Mohali and Zirakpur together, which are major transport hubs in the tri-city.

==== Line 3 ====
Line 3 will be 13 km (8.1 mi) long. It will connect Grain Market Chowk, Sector 39 Chandigarh to Transport Chowk, Sector 26 Chandigarh, wherein the localities of Vikas Marg and Tribune Chowk will have stations in between the route.

=== Phase 2 ===
The second phase of the project will consist of two more lines, taking the total number of lines to five. The network will be 25 km (16 mi) long, thereby increasing the total network length to 109 km (68 mi). It will be constructed after 2037.

==== Line 4 ====
Line 4 will be 5 km (3.1 mi) long. It will connect Airport Chowk to Manakpul Kallar.

==== Line 5 ====
Line 5 will be 20 km (12 mi) long. It will connect ISBT Zirakpur to Pinjore.

== Cost ==
The project is expected to cost ₹113.75 billion (US$1.2 billion), out of which ₹89.95 billion (US$960 million) will be borne by Chandigarh Administration, ₹16.8 billion (US$180 million) will be borne by Punjab Govt. and the remaining ₹7 billion (US$75 million) by Haryana Govt. The expected cost of the metro elevated section is ₹1.4 billion (US$15 million) per Km and that of the metro underground section is ₹3.5 billion (US$37 million) per Km. The metro will be completed in two phases. The estimated cost of Phase-I is ₹89.95 billion (US$960 million) and that of Phase-II is ₹23.8 billion (US$250 million). The revised cost of the first phase of the project is ₹ 10,570 crore.

== See also ==
- Transport in India
- Rapid transit in India
- List of rapid transit systems
- Delhi Metro
