= MumBaee =

Indian taxi magazine

Mumbaee
- Categories: Leisure
- Publisher: Mumbai Taximens’ Union
- First issue: 13 July 2009
- Country: India
- Based in: Mumbai
- Language: English

MumBaee is India's first in-taxi magazine, to be introduced in the taxicabs of Mumbai. It is provided free of cost to members of the Mumbai Taximens’ Union.

== See also ==
- Transport in India
