= Kota Kinabalu Monorail =

The Kota Kinabalu Monorail is a proposed monorail line project since 2009 to be constructed in the Kota Kinabalu area by the Sabah state government. The proposals generated mixed reactions between mayor and politicians. As reported in the government website, the project was in the ground breaking process under the Kota Kinabalu development plan.

== See also ==
- Monorails in Malaysia
- List of monorail systems
