= Saijpur =

- village
- Location in Gujarat, India Saijpur (India)
- Coordinates: 22.388830°N 72.8130100°E
- Country: India
- State: Gujarat
- District: Anand

Population
  - Total: 4,771

Languages
  - Official: Gujarati, Hindi
- Time zone: UTC+5:30 (IST)
- PIN: 388570
- Vehicle registration: GJ
- Nearest city: Borsad
- Website: gujaratindia.com

Saijpur is a village located in the Anand district of Gujarat, India, 11 km (6.8 mi) from Borsad. The pin code of Saijpur is 388570. The total population of the village is 4,771 (2,422 males, 2,349 females, 994 households). The major buildings of the village include the dairy, main entrance gate, primary school, high school, Chabutari, Mahadev Mandir, Ambe ma Mandir, and the Gram Panchayat community hall.

The majority of the people are farmers. Mainly the area is well known for production of tobacco. Khanpur and Ras are the nearest villages by distance. The village comes under BAVIS GAM PATIDAR SAMAJ community.
