= Gujarat Maritime University =

University of India

- Motto: (IAST): Tamso Ma Jyotirgamya
- Motto in English: "From darkness, lead me to light"
- Type: Private
- Established: 2017
- Affiliations: UGC
- Location: Koba, Gandhinagar, Gujarat, India; 23.1528°N 72.6608°E
- Campus: Urban
- Website: gmu.edu.in

Gujarat Maritime University (GMU) is a state private university under the Gujarat Maritime Board located in transitory campus of GNLU in Gandhinagar, Gujarat, India.

== Education ==
- LLM in Maritime Law and International Trade Law
- MBA in Shipping and Logistics
