= Metrolite =

Transit system in India

Metrolite is a light rail (LRT) urban transit system being planned in India for cities with lower ridership projection and as a feeder system for the existing metro systems. It will cater to lower passenger capacity at a reduced cost than a metro line. It will have dedicated tracks, separated from the road.

== Route and stations ==
The route alignment and stations will be at-grade, as far as possible to reduce construction cost and time. The system will have shelter island platforms and AFC gates, platform screen doors, X-ray machines and baggage scanners will not be present similar to a bus stop. Fencing will be provided on both sides of the track to segregate it from the road traffic. The at-grade stations will have 5.5 m width, and in case road width does not permit, one line will be provided on adjacent road parallel to the previous one. Entire roads might be closed for road traffic and converted to metrolite network. For the elevated section, there will be side platforms each having a minimum width of 1.12 m. Although concourse level will be absent, both platforms will be connected via foot bridges. The stations will have a vertical clearance of maximum 5.5 m above the road.

== Ticketing ==
The stations will not have any AFC gates to reduce cost, but ticket validators might be installed in trains and stations with National Common Mobility Card and other ticketing systems. Ticket checking will be random and heavy penalties will be levied on the passengers without a valid ticket.

== Rolling stock ==
The stainless steel or aluminium trains will be of 3-car unit, articulated with each other and with a peak hour peak direction traffic capacity of 2,000 to 15,000. The width of the trains is standardised at 2.65 m with a low floor height of 300–350 mm. Maximum operational speed will be 60 kmph. The trains will also have an obstruction detection system.

== Tracks and electrification ==
The tracks will be 1435 mm standard gauge, embedded on road for at-grade sections and ballast-less tracks for elevated sections. The maximum radius of curvature of tracks will be 25 m. Traction system shall be 750 V DC third rail or overhead catenary.

== Signalling and telecommunication ==
Communications-Based Train Control signalling along with Automatic Train Protection will be used. ATS and Interlocking will also be installed to prevent derailment due to over speeding while moving down the gradient, decongest a section while peak hours and route diversions. Signalling equipment rooms will be present only at stations nearby crossovers. The rooms will be an underground container below the platform. For road traffic, an integrated road and rail signalling system will be provided giving priority to the metrolite system. The system will have CCTV cameras in platforms and train communication will be done through Terrestrial Trunked Radio.

== List of proposed metrolite systems ==
Under construction
Approved
Proposed

System	Locale	State / Union Territory	Lines	Stations	Length	Type	Planned opening
Jammu Metro	Jammu	Jammu and Kashmir	2	40	43.50 km (27.03 mi)	25 kV AC railway electrification	2024
Srinagar Metro	Srinagar	Jammu and Kashmir	2	24	25 km (16 mi)	25 kV AC railway electrification	2024
Kozhikode Light Metro	Kozhikode	Kerala	1	14	13.30 km (8.26 mi)	25 kV AC railway electrification	TBD
Coimbatore Metro	Coimbatore	Tamil Nadu	5	TBD	147 km (91 mi)	25 kV AC railway electrification	TBD
Chennai Light Rail	Chennai	Tamil Nadu	1	TBD	15.50 km (9.63 mi)	25 kV AC railway electrification	TBD
Gorakhpur Metro	Gorakhpur	Uttar Pradesh	2	27	27.41 km (17.03 mi)	25 kV AC railway electrification	TBD
Uttarakhand Metro	Dehradun, Haridwar, Rishikesh	Uttarakhand	4	60	94.04 km (58.43 mi)	750 V DC third rail	2026
Raipur Metro	Raipur	Chhattisgarh	TBD	TBD	TBD	25 kV AC railway electrification	TBD
Delhi Metrolite	Delhi	Delhi	2	37	40.88 km (25.40 mi)	25 kV AC railway electrification	2026
Vadodara Metro	Vadodara	Gujarat	TBD	TBD	TBD	TBD	TBD
Rajkot Metro	Rajkot	Gujarat	TBD	TBD	TBD	TBD	TBD
Jamnagar Metro	Jamnagar	Gujarat	TBD	TBD	TBD	TBD	TBD
Bhavnagar Metro	Bhavnagar	Gujarat	TBD	TBD	TBD	TBD	TBD
Madurai Metro	Madurai	Tamil Nadu	3	41	91 km (57 mi)	25 kV AC railway electrification	2027
Bareilly Metro	Bareilly	Uttar Pradesh	1	10	20 km (12 mi)	TBD	TBD
Varanasi Metro	Varanasi	Uttar Pradesh	2	26	29.23 km (18.16 mi)	TBD	TBD
Prayagraj Metro	Prayagraj	Uttar Pradesh	2	39	42 km (26 mi)	TBD	TBD
Jhansi Metro	Jhansi	Uttar Pradesh	2	17	18 km (11 mi)	TBD	TBD
Mathura Metrolite	Mathura	Uttar Pradesh	TBD	TBD	TBD	TBD	TBD
Ayodhya Metrolite	Ayodhya	Uttar Pradesh	TBD	TBD	TBD	TBD	TBD
Greater Nashik Metro	Nashik	Maharashtra	TBD	TBD	TBD	TBD	TBD

== See also ==
- Metro Neo
- Urban rail transit in India
