= Urban rail transit in India =

Cities in India with various urban transit systems

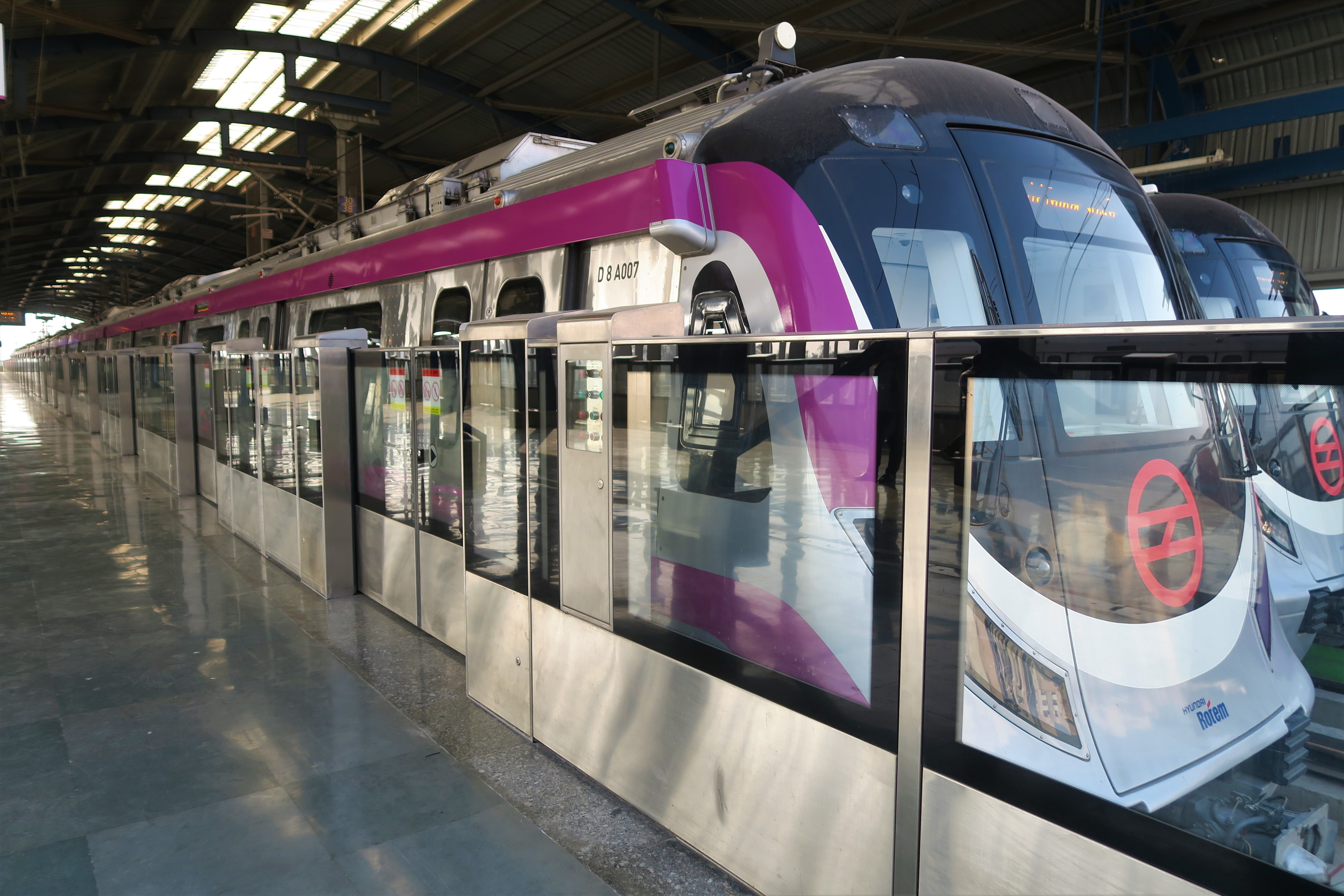
The Magenta Line of the Delhi Metro

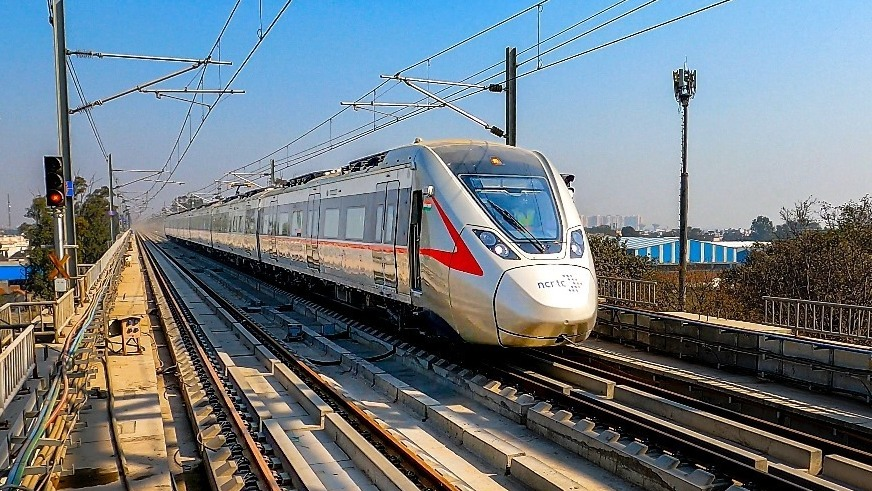
India's semi-high speed regional rapid rail, the RapidX

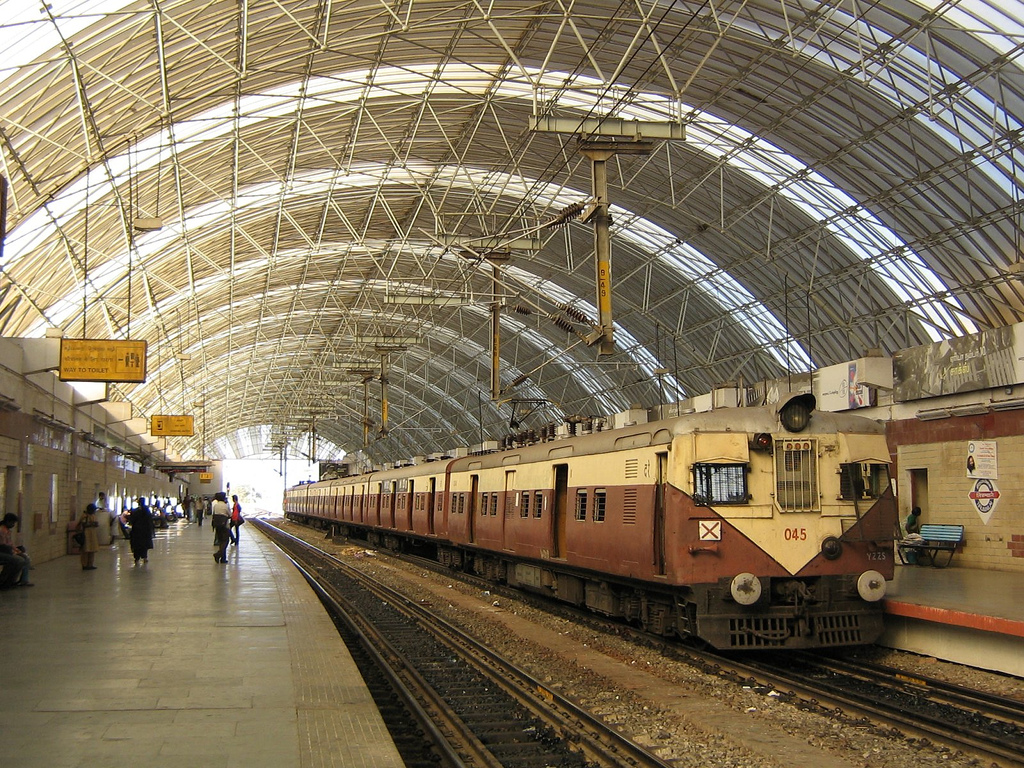
Mylapore MRTS station in Chennai. The suburban rail is the largest urban transit mode in India by ridership.

Urban rail transit in India consists of various modes of rail based public transport systems in urban areas of India, such as metro, suburban rail, monorail, regional rapid rail, tram and funicular railway.

The presence of metro rail in India began with commissioning of the first system in Kolkata in 1984. They were later introduced gradually in other cities like Delhi and Bengaluru, eventually becoming popular in all urban agglomerations.

According to a report published in 2025, a total of 36.5 billion people traveled annually in metro systems across India's fifteen major cities, placing the country as one of the busiest urban rapid transit hubs in the world in terms of commuters. In 2025, the Delhi Metro alone carries an average of 46.3 lakh (4.63 million) passengers daily, and the Delhi-Meerut RRTS has an operational speed of 160 km/h. Across all metro systems in India, daily ridership is expected to be significantly higher, possibly exceeding 10 million. As of 2026, the cumulative length of 1,126.23 kilometres (699.81 miles) of twenty-one metro systems in India makes it the third longest in operation in the world.

The Ministry of Urban Development's Urban Transport wing is the nodal division for coordination, appraisal, and approval of Urban Transport matters including Metro Rail Projects at the central level. All the interventions in urban transport by the Ministry of Urban Development are carried out under the provisions of the National Urban Transport Policy, 2006.

Currently, the Delhi-Meerut RRTS is the fastest urban rail transit system in India, featuring an operational speed of 160 km/h and an average speed (including stoppage time) of 100 km/h.

== Terminology ==
Indian cities have various types of urban transit systems operational, under construction and planned. These systems are being implemented based on the population of a city, financial feasibility and demand.

Urban transit type	Capacity	Speed	Frequency of stations / stops	Locale	Right of way	Rail based	Cost to build and operate
Metro	High	Moderate	High	Intracity	Yes	Yes	High
Suburban railway	High	Moderate	Medium	Regional	No †	Yes	Moderate
Medium-capacity metro	Medium	Moderate	High	Intracity	Yes	Yes	High
Light rail	Medium	Moderate	High	Intracity	Partial ‡	Yes	Moderate
Monorail	Medium	Moderate	High	Intracity	Yes	Yes	High
Regional rapid rail	High	High	Low	Regional	Yes	Yes	High
Tram	Low	Slow	High	Neighborhood	No	Yes	Low
Bus rapid transit	Low	Moderate	High	Intracity	Yes	No	Low
Metro Neo	Low	Moderate	High	Intracity	Yes	No	Moderate
Water metro	Low	Slow	Medium	Intracity	Yes	No	Low
Funicular	Low	Slow	Low	Neighborhood	No	Yes	Low

^{†} Note: Suburban rail in India utilises the broad gauge network of Indian Railways and mostly shares the network and infrastructure with the rest of Indian Railway services.
^{‡} Note: Light Rail systems are mostly fenced and can be built with complete right of way if preferred so.

- Metro: The rapid transit or popularly known as metro in India, is an urban high-capacity rail system, commonly operated in metropolitan cities. These systems are segregated from Indian Railways and have their right-of-way.
- Suburban rail: Suburban rail or popularly known as local train system in India, is an urban rail transit system where the suburbs are connected to the city's centre. These systems are linked to and operated by Indian Railways. Example: Mumbai Suburban Railway.
- Medium-capacity rail: It is a rapid transit (metro) system which has a capacity higher than light rail but lower than rapid transit system to serve a medium demand. It is built considering the future rise in demand, so that it can be converted into a regular metro. Example: Rapid Metro Gurgaon.
- Light rail: Light rail which is also known as Metro Lite is used in cities that have low demand. It is a combination of rapid transit and tram systems. It has a higher capacity and speed compared to tram services and has dedicated tracks that are mostly fenced. Example: Srinagar Metro.
- Monorail: This system has trains running on a single rail/beam. It has found its application in medium capacity transport. The system however finds use case in specific scenarios such as the need for a higher capacity system on hilly terrains or in cities with tighter spaces where a surface level light rail or elevated metro would not be possible. However, rake procurement and quick emergency evacuation issues remain. Example: Mumbai Monorail.
- Regional rapid rail: This system is operated either between two similarly sized cities, which are close to each other or between a larger city and smaller cities lying nearby. Example: Delhi–Meerut RRTS.
- Tram: These systems are one of the oldest modes of urban transport in India. They are low capacity, slow-moving trains which run on tracks that are embedded in the urban streets. Example: Kolkata Tram.
- Funicular: It is a type of cable railway system that connects points along a railway track laid on a steep slope. The system is characterized by two counterbalanced carriages (also called cars or trains) permanently attached to opposite ends of a haulage cable, which is looped over a pulley at the upper end of the track. Example: Malanggad funicular near Thane.

=== Non-rail based urban transit ===
- Bus rapid transit: The bus rapid transit systems in India use conventional buses or high capacity buses and have their own right-of-way, separated from the rest of the traffic. Example: Ahmedabad Bus Rapid Transit System.
- Metro Neo: These are the bus rapid transit systems that use overhead wires with power supply, similar to a trolleybus but with a higher capacity. They also have either a complete or partial right-of-way. Example: Greater Nashik Metro.
- Water metro: A water-based urban transit system usually implemented in cities which are situated on river banks. These systems are basically integrated ferry systems. Example: Kochi Water Metro.
- Aerial lift: A ropeway/cableway system which is usually implemented on tourist and hilly regions. However, due its low cost and footprint during construction, it is being considered as a low capacity urban transportation solution where the demand is not high and where the spaces are too tight for an elevated metro or surface level light rail. Example: Kashi ropeway.

== History ==
=== Early history ===
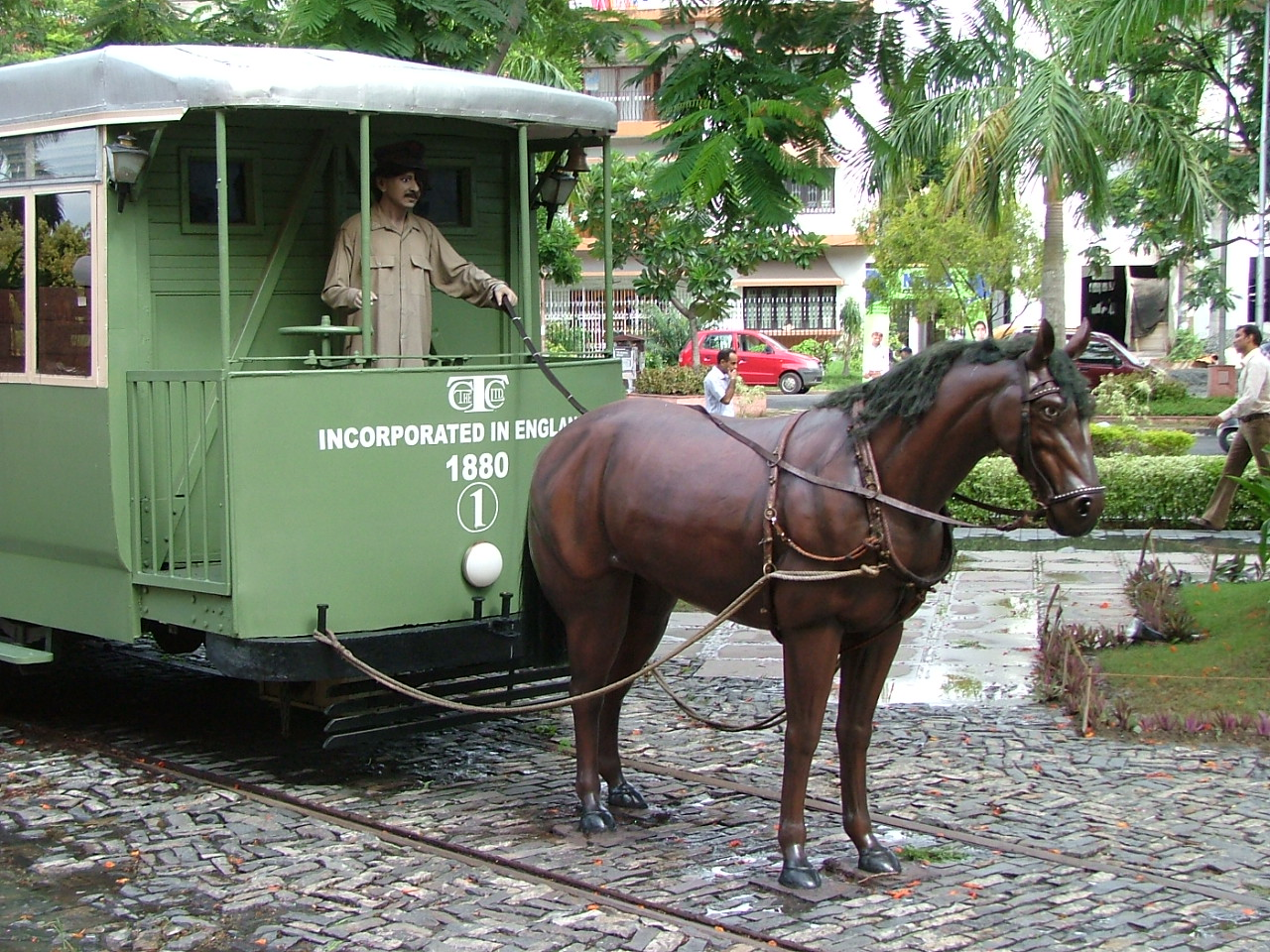
Life-size model of a horse-drawn tram at the City Centre arcade, Salt Lake, Kolkata

The first-ever mode of the urban rail transit system in India was commuter rail (or suburban rail), built in Mumbai on 16 April 1853. The first passenger train was flagged off from Bori Bunder (present-day Chhatrapati Shivaji Terminus in Mumbai) from where it travelled to Thane, covering a distance of 34 km in an hour and fifteen minutes. This made it the Asia's first suburban railway. At the turn of the 20th century, tram systems began to sprawl across the four major cities of India, viz. Delhi, Kolkata, Chennai and Mumbai, and helped local population to meet their intracity transportation needs. Horse-drawn tram was first introduced in Kolkata in 1873 and the electric trams began to operate in Chennai in 1895, later the cities of Mumbai, Kanpur, and Delhi saw trams being introduced. These services were discontinued in all Indian cities between 1933 and 1964, except for Kolkata where they operate on streets to the present day as heritage.

=== Metro and mass rapid transit ===
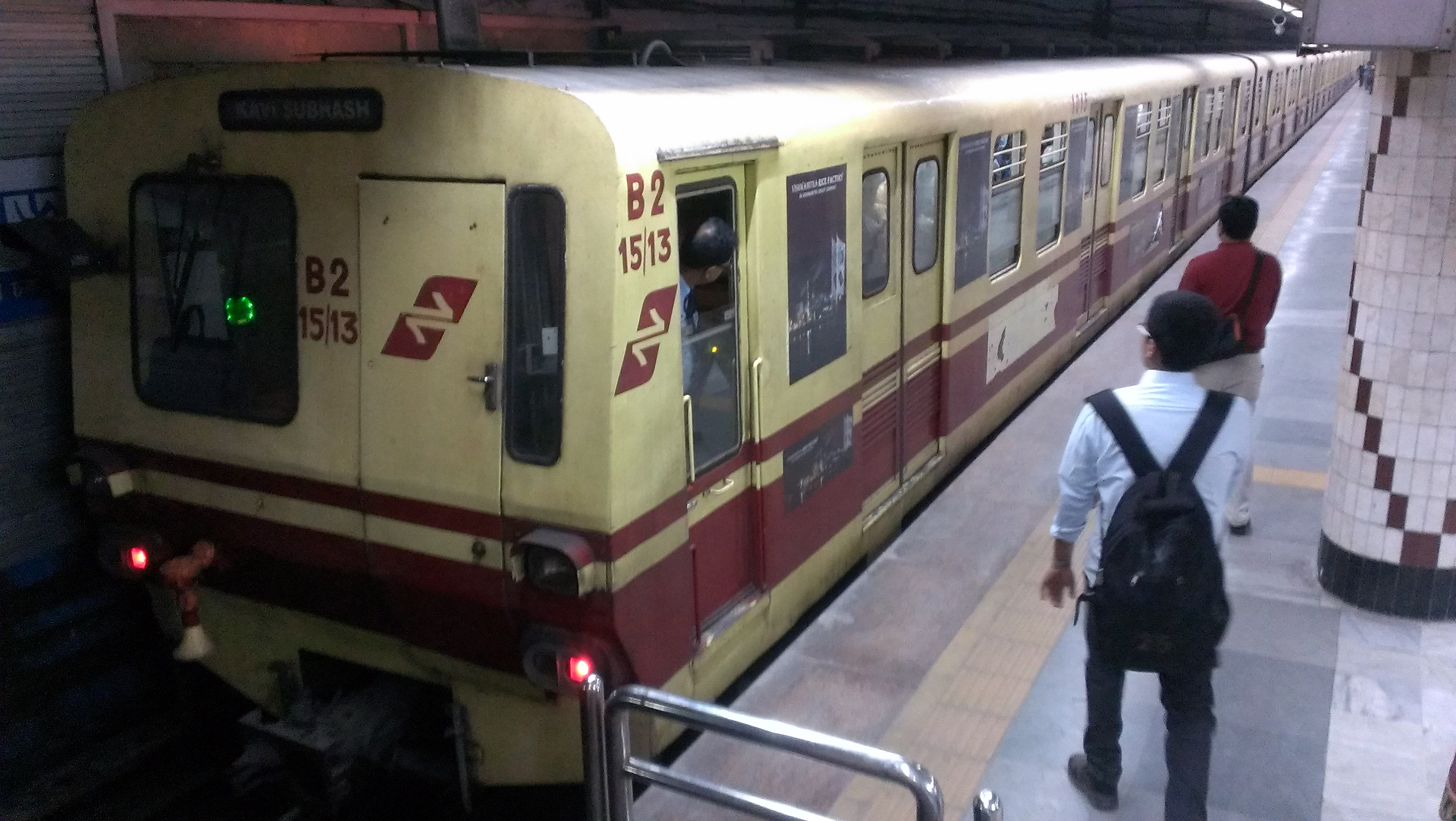
Old Kolkata Metro BHEL 1000 metro rake

In September 1919, during a session of the Imperial Legislative Council at Shimla, a committee was set up by W. E. Crum that recommended a metro line for Kolkata. The next proposal for a metro system was mooted by government of West Bengal in 1949-50 and a survey was conducted by French experts. However, the proposal could not be brought into the effect and India had to wait for its first metro service. It was twenty three years later when the foundation stone was laid in Kolkata in 1972 to commence the construction of the ambitious metro system. On 24 October 1984, India saw its first metro system operational in Kolkata. After several struggles and bureaucratic hurdles, a stretch of 3.4 km was opened with five stations on the line. On 1 November 1995, the Chennai MRTS began its operations, becoming the first fully elevated railway line and also the country's longest elevated suburban railway corridor spanning 18 km on the elevated section alone of total 24.3 km.

The first concept of an urban rapid transit system in Delhi came out during 1969, when a traffic and travel characteristics study was conducted. The bus systems which catered the public transportation in the city soon began to run out of capacity and the traffic was on the rise, this soon became a growing concern. The concepts for an urban transit system were considered as the need for the country's capital. After planning, a proposal was made in 1984, which revealed plans for constructing three underground corridors and augmentation of the existing suburban rail system. The construction began on 1 October 1998 and the first line was operational on 24 December 2002. With 348.12 kilometres (216.31 mi), the Delhi Metro went on to be the longest and by far the busiest metro system in India, which also served as a role model to other Indian cities.

=== Monorails and their replacement ===
While the political capital of India was expanding on its success by constructing new metro lines, suburban railways remained as the dominant mode of transport in the financial capital, Mumbai. According to Mumbai Metropolitan Region Development Authority (MMRDA) the city bus services operating in narrow and crowded areas of the city were slow-moving and caused traffic congestion hence a rapid transit system was necessary. Since the city already had planned metro services and since the suburban railways also connected major parts of the city, a feeder system to these services was proposed in the form of Monorail. After the construction was completed, On 1 February 2014, Mumbai Monorail became the first of its kind in India.

In the early 2010s, many cities had conceived the plan to build monorails as the major urban transportation solution to their cities. However, Mumbai's monorail soon began to reveal the underlying problems of a monorail system. The issues such as low ridership, inefficient track maintenance (accessibility of the tracks during maintenance as well as the time taken to repair the tracks), train slowing down at the switches and for the fact that the monorail tracks had to be entirely elevated with a dedicated depot and set of rolling stocks, raised the concerns on feasibility, cost of construction and operation of the new lines significantly. For the similar reasons, almost all of the monorail systems around the world are seen in amusement parks or similar theme parks instead as a solution to the urban public transportation. A traditional light rail system soon emerged as the efficient mode but with cheaper cost and greater capacity than what monorail offered. As a result, many Indian cities replaced their proposed monorail projects with either a regular metro or a light rail system.

== Rapid transit ==
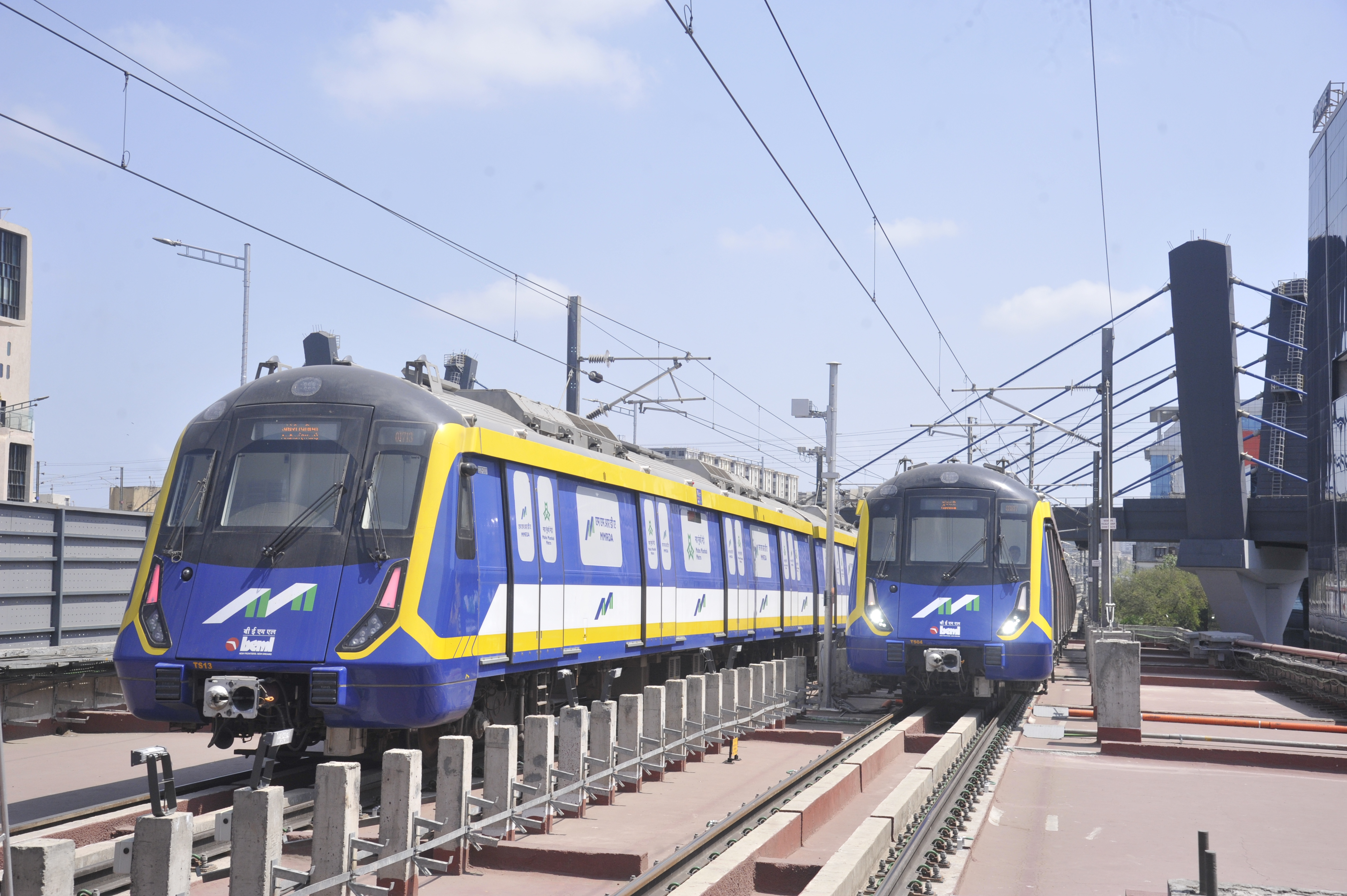
Mumbai Metro

There are currently 21 operational rapid transit (officially and popularly called Metro) systems across India, with Delhi Metro being the largest. As of November 2026, India has 1,133.73 kilometres (704.47 miles) of operational metro lines in 21 cities. India's metro network is the third longest in the world, behind China and USA. A further 775.74 kilometres (482.02 miles) of lines are under construction.

Apart from the Kolkata Metro (which has its own zone under Indian Railways), these rapid transit metro lines are not operated by Indian Railways, but a separate set of local authorities. In addition to their metro systems, the cities of Chennai and Hyderabad have mass transit systems operated by the Indian Railways, known as the Chennai Suburban, the Chennai MRTS, and the Hyderabad MMTS, respectively. The first rapid transit system in India is the Kolkata Metro, which started operations in 1984. Kolkata Metro also the first underwater metro line in the country. The Delhi Metro has the largest network in the entire country.

=== Implementation ===
In 2006, the National Urban Transport Policy had proposed the construction of a metro rail system in every city with a population of at least 20 lakh (2 million) people.

From 2002 to 2014, the Indian metro infrastructure expanded by 248 km.

Later on 11 August 2014, Government of India had announced that it would provide financial assistance for the implementation of a metro rail system to all Indian cities having a population of more than 1 million. In May 2015, the Government of India approved the Union Urban Development Ministry's proposal to implement metro rail systems in 50 cities, with the majority of the planned projects were to be implemented through special purpose vehicles, which will be established as 50:50 joint ventures between the Union and respective State Government. The Government of India would invest an estimated ₹5 lakh crore (US$53 billion).

In a new draft policy unveiled in March 2017, the Government of India stated that it wanted state governments to consider metro rail as the "last option" and implement it only after considering all other possible mass rapid transit systems. The decision was taken due to the high cost of constructing metro rail systems. In August 2017, the Government of India announced that it would not provide financial assistance to the new metro rail project unless some sort of private partnership is involved.

=== List of systems ===
As of 13 November 2026

System	Locale	State/UT	Lines operational	Stations	Length		Opened	Annual ridership (in millions)
System	Locale	State/UT	Lines operational	Stations	Operational	Under construction	Opened	Annual ridership (in millions)
Agra Metro	Agra	Uttar Pradesh	1	6	5.20 km	24.47 km	6 March 2024	—N/a
Ahmedabad Metro	Ahmedabad, Gandhinagar, GIFT City	Gujarat	4	53	68.23 km	—N/a	4 March 2019	51.03 (2025^{*}) (Note: Total ridership figures from April 2025 to March 2026)
Bhoj Metro	Bhopal	Madhya Pradesh	1	8	6.22 km	21.68 km	21 December 2025	—N/a
Chennai Metro	Chennai Metropolitan Area	Tamil Nadu	3	52 (Note: There are a total of three interchange stations. Two interchanges of Phase 1 is counted only once, while one interchange having 2 stations connected by skywalk is counted twice)	68.74 km	104.30 km	29 June 2015	111.90 (2025)
Delhi Metro	Delhi NCR	Delhi	10	271 (Note: There are a total of 271 stations. If transfer stations are counted only once, the number comes down to 243 stations as there are 26 transfer stations serving two lines and one station serving three lines. Stations of Noida Metro and Gurgaon Metro are not counted as well. If stations of Noida Metro and Gurgaon Metro are to be included with the 271 stations, a total of 303 stations exist.)	374.47 km (Note: The lengths of the Noida Metro and Gurgaon Metro are not counted with the Delhi Metro. If they were counted, the total length of the three systems would be 416 km.)	61.93 km	24 December 2002	2032.30 (2024^{*}) (Note: From 2019 onwards the DMRC changed the ridership calculation to count every trip taken by a passenger on a line. This means that a passenger that takes 2 connections will count 3 times towards ridership. This is different from the more standard practice of counting entire journeys applied in other metro systems. Therefore, Delhi metro reports approximately 55% higher ridership when compared to similar transit systems worldwide.)
Gurugram Metro	Gurgaon	Haryana	1	11	12.10 km	28.50 km	14 November 2013	14.60 (2024^{*})
Hyderabad Metro	Hyderabad Metropolitan Region	Telangana	3	59	69.20 km	—N/a	29 November 2017	178.00 (2024) (Note: The figure of 147,984,025 reflects the total monthly ridership for FY 2024–25 (April 2024 – March 2025), compiled using actual data as the report was published post-fiscal year.)
Indore Metro	Indore	Madhya Pradesh	1	16	17.05 km	20.03 km	31 May 2025	—N/a
Jaipur Metro	Jaipur	Rajasthan	1	11	11.98 km	2.85 km	3 June 2015	20.05 (2024^{*})
Kanpur Metro	Kanpur	Uttar Pradesh	1	14	16.00 km	15.05 km	28 December 2021	11.06 (2024)
Kochi Metro	Kochi	Keralam	1	25	28.12 km	11.20 km	17 June 2017	36.52 (2025)
Kolkata Metro	Greater Kolkata	West Bengal	5	58 (Note: There are a total of three interchange stations counted with the number of lines they serve. If interchange stations are counted only once, the number comes down to 55 stations.)	73.42 km	30.80 km	24 October 1984	225.50 (2025)
Lucknow Metro	Lucknow	Uttar Pradesh	1	21	22.90 km	—N/a	5 September 2017	31.15 (2024^{*})
Mumbai Metro	Mumbai Metropolitan Region	Maharashtra	4	77	91.48 km	108.78 km	8 June 2014	273.41 (2025-26) (Note: Figure extrapolated from a sum of 157 million for Line 1 and the sum of average daily ridership figures of Lines 2A & 7 (170,940.17) and 3 (1,48,000) over a year as mentioned in the cited reports)
Meerut Metro	Meerut	Uttar Pradesh	1	13	23.60 km	—N/a	22 February 2026	—N/a
Nagpur Metro	Nagpur	Maharashtra	2	37	38.22 km	43.00 km	8 March 2019	33.88 (2024^{*}) (Note: Figure extrapolated from 75,000 average daily ridership figures over a year as mentioned in the cited report)
Namma Metro	Bengaluru	Karnataka	4	91 (Note: There are a total of three interchange stations counted with the number of lines they serve. If interchange stations are counted only once, the number comes down to 88 stations.)	103.60 km	71.94 km	20 October 2011	278.54 (2024^{*})
Navi Mumbai Metro	Navi Mumbai	Maharashtra	1	11	11.10 km	—N/a	17 November 2023	5.76 (2026) (Note: Figure extrapolated from a ridership figure of 11,528,297 over two years as mentioned in the cited report)
Noida Metro	Noida & Greater Noida	Uttar Pradesh	1	21	29.70 km	—N/a	25 January 2019	22.41 (2025)
Patna Metro	Patna	Bihar	1	4	6.10 km	31.11 km	6 October 2025	—N/a
Pune Metro	Pune Metropolitan Region	Maharashtra	3	46 (Note: There are a total of two interchange stations counted with the number of lines they serve. If interchange stations are counted only once, the number comes down to 44 stations.)	56.30 km	54.53 km	6 March 2022	67.10 (2025)
Total			50	905	1133.73 km	630.17 km	—N/a	3393.21 million

Table note

^* Indicates ridership figures based on the fiscal year rather than the calendar year.

=== Systems in development ===
As of 31 July 2026

Under construction
Planned

System	Locale	Length		Construction began	Planned opening
System	Locale	Under construction	Planned	Construction began	Planned opening
Surat Metro	Surat	41.93 km (26.05 mi)		2021	2027
Thane Metro	Thane	29.5 km (18.3 mi)		2025	2029
Bhubaneswar Metro	Bhubaneswar		26.024 km (16.171 mi)	TBD	2028
Visakhapatnam Metro	Visakhapatnam		76.9 km (47.8 mi)	2026	2029
Vijayawada Metro	Vijayawada		75 km (47 mi)	2026	2029
Rajkot Metro	Rajkot		38 km (24 mi)	TBD	TBD
Vadodara Metro	Vadodara		40 km (25 mi)	TBD	TBD
Kozhikode Metro	Kozhikode		44 km (27 mi)	TBD	TBD
Thiruvananthapuram Metro	Thiruvananthapuram		42.1 km (26.2 mi)	TBD	TBD
Coimbatore Metro	Coimbatore		40 km (25 mi)	TBD	TBD
Madurai Metro	Madurai		32 km (20 mi)	TBD	TBD
Prayagraj Metro	Prayagraj		44 km (27 mi)	TBD	TBD
Total		71.43 km (44.38 mi)	458.024 km (284.603 mi)		

=== List of lines ===
As of 13 November 2026

India has a total of 50 lines of metro under operation in 21 cities.

Line	System	Length	Stations	Rolling stock	Commencement	Latest extension
Blue Line	Kolkata	32.13 km (19.96 mi)	26	ICF Medha, CRRC Dalian	24 October 1984	22 February 2021
Green Line	Kolkata	16.60 km (10.31 mi)	12	BEML Limited	13 February 2020	22 August 2025
Purple Line	Kolkata	7.75 km (4.82 mi)	7	ICF Medha	30 December 2022	6 March 2024
Orange Line	Kolkata	9.50 km (5.90 mi)	9	ICF Medha	6 March 2024	22 August 2025
Yellow Line	Kolkata	7.04 km (4.37 mi)	4	ICF Medha	22 August 2025	—N/a
Red Line	Delhi	34.55 km (21.47 mi)	29	Hyundai Rotem and BEML Limited	25 December 2002	8 March 2019
Yellow Line	Delhi	49.02 km (30.46 mi)	37	BEML Limited	20 December 2004	10 November 2015
Blue Line (Main)	Delhi	56.11 km (34.87 mi)	50	BEML Limited	31 December 2005	9 March 2019
Blue Line (Branch)	Delhi	8.51 km (5.29 mi)	8	BEML Limited	10 May 2009	14 July 2011
Green Line (Main)	Delhi	28.79 km (17.89 mi)	24	BEML Limited	3 April 2010	24 June 2018
Violet Line	Delhi	46.34 km (28.79 mi)	34	BEML Limited	3 October 2010	19 November 2018
Airport Express	Delhi	22.70 km (14.11 mi)	6	CAF	23 February 2011	17 September 2023
Magenta Line	Delhi	50.18 km (31.18 mi)	33	Hyundai Rotem and Alstom Metropolis	25 December 2017	8 March 2026
Pink Line	Delhi	73.49 km (45.66 mi)	46	Hyundai Rotem and BEML Limited	14 March 2018	8 March 2026
Grey Line	Delhi	5.19 km (3.22 mi)	4	Hyundai Rotem	4 October 2019	18 September 2021
Purple Line	Bengaluru	43.49 km (27.02 mi)	37	BEML Limited	20 October 2011	9 October 2023
Green Line	Bengaluru	33.46 km (20.79 mi)	32	BEML Limited	1 March 2014	7 November 2024
Yellow Line	Bengaluru	19.15 km (11.90 mi)	16	CRRC Nanjing Puzhen and Titagarh Rail Systems	10 August 2025	—N/a
Pink Line	Bengaluru	7.50 km (4.66 mi)	6	BEML Limited	13 November 2026	—N/a
Line 1	Gurugram	12.85 km (7.98 mi)	11	Siemens	14 November 2013	31 March 2017
Blue Line	Mumbai	11.40 km (7.08 mi)	12	CRRC Nanjing Puzhen	8 June 2014	—N/a
Yellow Line	Mumbai	25.011 km (15.541 mi)	17	BEML Limited	2 April 2022	13 August 2026
Red Line	Mumbai	21.20 km (13.17 mi)	14	BEML Limited	2 April 2022	13 August 2026
Aqua Line	Mumbai	33.50 km (20.82 mi)	27	Alstom Metropolis	5 October 2024	8 October 2025
Pink Line	Jaipur	11.97 km (7.44 mi)	11	BEML Limited	3 June 2015	23 September 2020
Blue Line	Chennai	32.65 km (20.29 mi)	25	Alstom	21 September 2016	13 March 2022
Green Line	Chennai	22.00 km (13.67 mi)	17	Alstom	29 June 2015	25 May 2018
Yellow Line	Chennai	14.60 km (9.07 mi)	11	Alstom	11 October 2026	—N/a
Blue Line	Kochi	28.13 km (17.48 mi)	25	Alstom Metropolis	17 June 2017	6 March 2024
Red Line	Lucknow	22.87 km (14.21 mi)	21	Alstom	5 September 2017	8 March 2019
Red Line	Hyderabad	29.21 km (18.15 mi)	27	Hyundai Rotem	29 November 2017	24 September 2018
Blue Line	Hyderabad	27.00 km (16.78 mi)	23	Hyundai Rotem	29 November 2017	29 November 2019
Green Line	Hyderabad	11 km (6.8 mi)	10	Hyundai Rotem	7 February 2020	—N/a
Aqua Line	Noida	29.70 km (18.45 mi)	21	CRRC	25 January 2019	—N/a
Blue Line	Ahmedabad	21.23 km (13.19 mi)	18	Hyundai Rotem	4 March 2019	8 December 2024
Red Line	Ahmedabad	18.87 km (11.73 mi)	14	Hyundai Rotem	1 October 2022	—N/a
Yellow Line	Ahmedabad	23.84 km (14.81 mi)	21	Hyundai Rotem	16 September 2024	11 January 2026
Violet Line	Ahmedabad	5.42 km (3.37 mi)	3	Hyundai Rotem	17 September 2024	—N/a
Orange Line	Nagpur	19.658 km (12.215 mi)	18	CRRC	8 March 2019	11 December 2022
Aqua Line	Nagpur	18.557 km (11.531 mi)	20	CRRC	28 January 2020	11 December 2022
Orange Line	Kanpur	16.00 km (9.94 mi)	14	Alstom	28 December 2021	31 May 2025
Purple Line	Pune	16.59 km (10.31 mi)	13	Titagarh Firema	6 March 2022	29 September 2024
Aqua Line	Pune	14.66 km (9.11 mi)	16	Titagarh Firema	6 March 2022	6 March 2024
Pink Line	Pune	23.20 km (14.42 mi)	17	Alstom Metropolis	3 November 2026	—N/a
Line 1	Navi Mumbai	11.10 km (6.90 mi)	11	CRRC Zhuzhou Locomotive	17 November 2023	—N/a
Yellow Line	Agra	5.20 km (3.23 miles)	6	Alstom Movia	6 March 2024	—N/a
Yellow Line	Indore	18.30 km (11.37 miles)	16	Alstom Movia	31 May 2025	6 September 2026
Blue Line	Patna	6.20 km (3.85 miles)	4	Titagarh Firema	6 October 2025	2 July 2026
Orange Line	Bhopal	6.22 km (3.86 miles)	8	Alstom Movia	21 December 2025	—N/a
Line 1	Meerut	23.6 km (14.7 miles)	12	Alstom	22 February 2026	—N/a

Note: Only operational lines are listed.

== Suburban rail ==
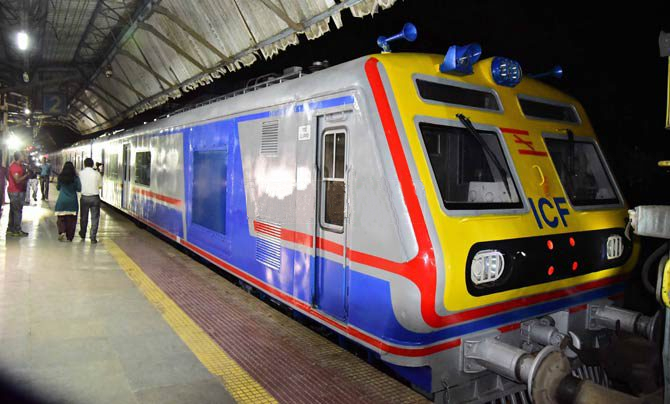
Mumbai Suburban Railway

Suburban rail plays a major role in the public transport system of many major Indian cities. These services are operated by Indian Railways. Suburban rail is a rail service between a central business district and the suburbs, a conurbation or other locations that draw large numbers of people daily. The trains are called suburban trains. These trains are also referred to as "local trains" or "locals". The suburban rail systems in Hyderabad, Pune, Lucknow–Kanpur and Delhi do not have dedicated suburban tracks but share tracks with long-distance trains. The suburban rail system of Mumbai, Kolkata and Chennai have both dedicated tracks and tracks shared with long-distance trains.

The first suburban rail system in India is Mumbai Suburban Railway, which started operations in 1853. The Kolkata Suburban Railway has the largest network in the entire country. The Chennai Suburban Railway started its operations in 1931.

Suburban trains that handle commuter traffic are all electric multiple units (EMUs). They usually have nine or 12 coaches, though can sometimes include 15 to handle rush hour traffic. One unit of an EMU train consists of one power car and two general coaches. Thus a nine coach EMU is made up of three units having one power car at each end and one at the middle. The rakes in the suburban rails run on 25 kV AC. Ridership on India's suburban railways has risen from 1.2 million in 1970–71 to 4.4 million in 2012–13. The suburban railways of Mumbai, Kolkata and Chennai occupy no more than 7.1% of the Indian Railways network, but account for 53.2% of all railway passengers. In some cities of India, the opening of rapid transit systems has led to a decline in the use of the suburban rail system.

As of 2 May 2026

System	Locale	Lines	Stations	Length	Opened	Annual ridership (in billions)
Chennai Suburban Railway	Chennai metropolitan area	8	300+	1,200 km (750 mi)	1931	1.01
Chennai Mass Rapid Transit System	Chennai	1	21	24.2 km (15.0 mi)	1 November 1995	0.1
Delhi Suburban Railway	National Capital Region	1	46	320 km (200 mi)	1 October 1975	–
Hyderabad Multi-Modal Transport System	Hyderabad Metropolitan Region	5	44	90 km (56 mi)	9 August 2003	0.01825
Kolkata Suburban Railway	Kolkata metropolitan region	24	458	1,501 km (933 mi)	15 August 1854	1.825
Mumbai Suburban Railway	Mumbai Metropolitan Region	7	154	450.90 km (280.18 mi)	16 April 1853	8.0
Pune Suburban Railway	Pune Metropolitan Region	1	17	63 km (39 mi)	11 March 1978	0.022
Lucknow–Kanpur Suburban Railway	Uttar Pradesh	1	16	72 km (45 mi)	23 April 1867	
Barabanki–Lucknow Suburban Railway	Uttar Pradesh	1	13	65 km (40 mi)		
Pernem–Karwar Suburban Railway	Goa / Karnataka	1	12	117.2 km (73 mi)		
Total	10	51	1058	3,574.04 km (2,220.81 mi)		5.5

=== Systems in development ===
As of 24 April 2024

Under construction

System	Locale	Lines	Stations	Length	Planned opening
Bengaluru Suburban Railway	Bengaluru	4	69	160.0 km (99.4 mi)	2026

== Regional rapid transit ==
Regional rapid transit systems in India are higher-speed passenger rail services that operate beyond the limits of urban areas, and either connect similarly sized cities, or metropolitan cities and surrounding towns/cities, outside at the outer rim of a suburban belt.

The following list excludes passenger train services provided by Indian Railways.

System	Metro area	Stations	Operational length	Planned stations	Planned length	Operator(s)	Opened	Latest extension
Delhi–Meerut RRTS	NCR	15	82.15 km (51.05 mi)	16	82.15 km (51.05 mi)	NCRTC	20 October 2023 (priority corridor)	22 February 2026

=== Systems in development ===
As of 26 February 2026

Under construction
Planned

System	Metro area	Stations	Length	Planned opening
Delhi–Alwar RRTS	NCR	22	199 km (124 mi)	2031
Delhi–Panipat RRTS	NCR	15	103 km (64 mi)	2030

== Monorail ==
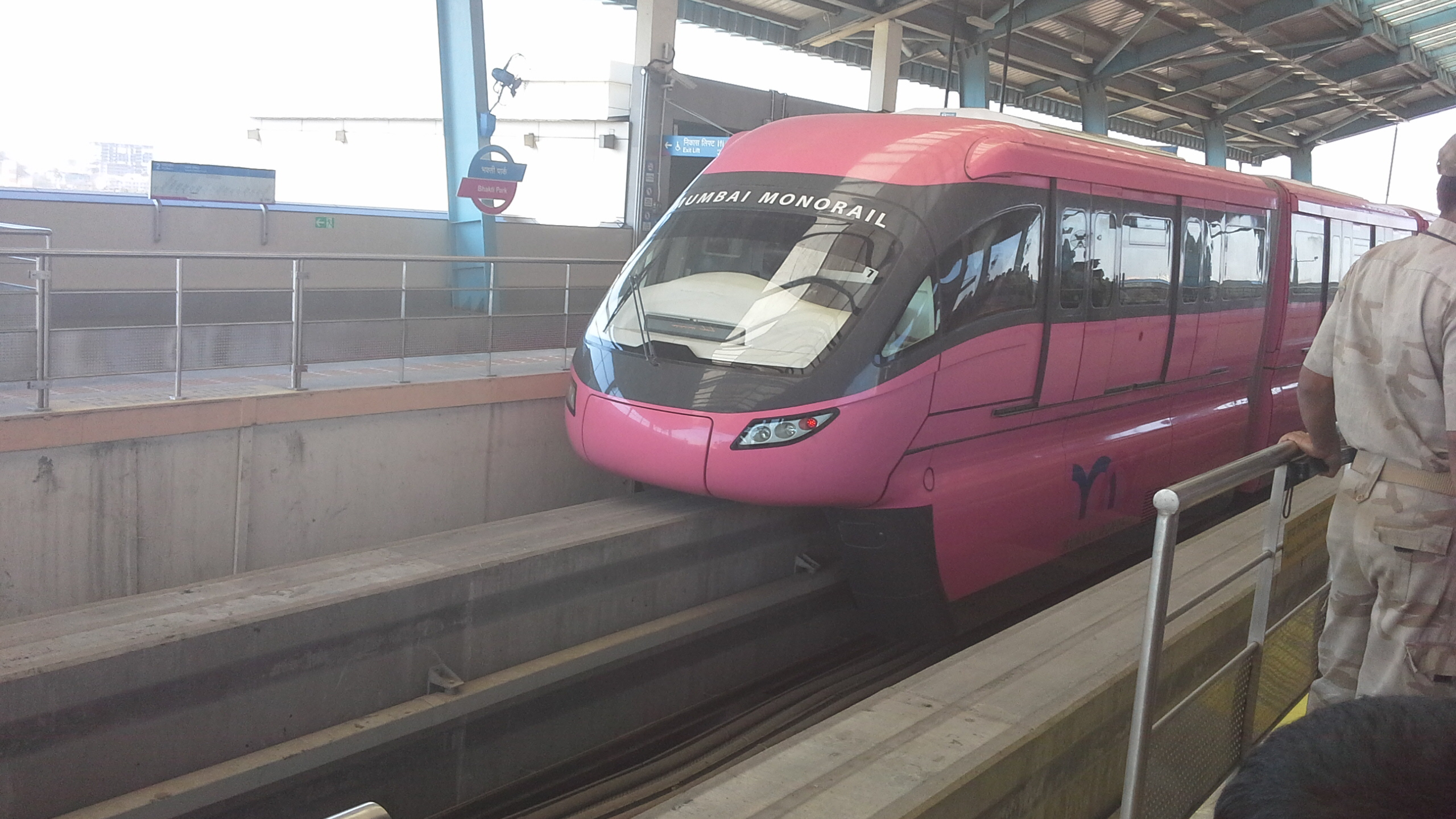
The Mumbai Monorail is the only operational monorail system in India.

The Mumbai Monorail, which opened on 2 February 2014, is the first and only operational monorail system used for urban transit in India. Many other Indian cities had planned monorail projects, as a feeder system to the metro, but with issues like fewer options of rake manufacturers, lower capacity but high cost to construct, difficulty in evacuation during an emergency led to them considering a light rail instead.

System	Locale	Lines	Stations	Length	Opened	Annual ridership (in millions)
Mumbai Monorail	Mumbai	1	17	19.53 km (12.14 mi)	2 February 2014	1.2

=== Systems in development ===
Planned

System	Locale	Lines	Stations	Length	Planned opening
Ahmedabad-Dholera SIR Monorail	Dholera; Ahmedabad	1	7	40.3 km (25.0 mi)	TBD (Note: Approved in January 2021. Set to open three or four years after commencement of construction.)

=== Abandoned systems ===
Defunct

System	Locale	Length	Notes
Skybus Metro	Madgaon	1.60 km (0.99 mi)	Defunct and scrapped after the operation. Deemed unsafe by KRC.

== Light rail ==
Light rail transit (LRT) or popularly known as Metrolite in India, is a form of urban rail transit characterized by a combination of rapid transit and tram systems. It usually operates at a higher capacity than trams, and often on an exclusive right-of-way similar to rapid transit. Several tier-2 cities in India have proposed light rail systems.

Under construction
Planned

System	Locale	Lines	Stations	Length	Type	Planned opening
Jammu Metro	Jammu	2	40	43.50 km (27.03 mi)	25 kV AC railway electrification	TBD
Srinagar Metro	Srinagar	2	24	25 km (16 mi)	25 kV AC railway electrification	TBD
Chennai Light Rail	Chennai	1	TBD	15.50 km (9.63 mi)	25 kV AC railway electrification	TBD
Gorakhpur Metro	Gorakhpur	2	27	27.41 km (17.03 mi)	25 kV AC railway electrification	TBD

== Tram ==
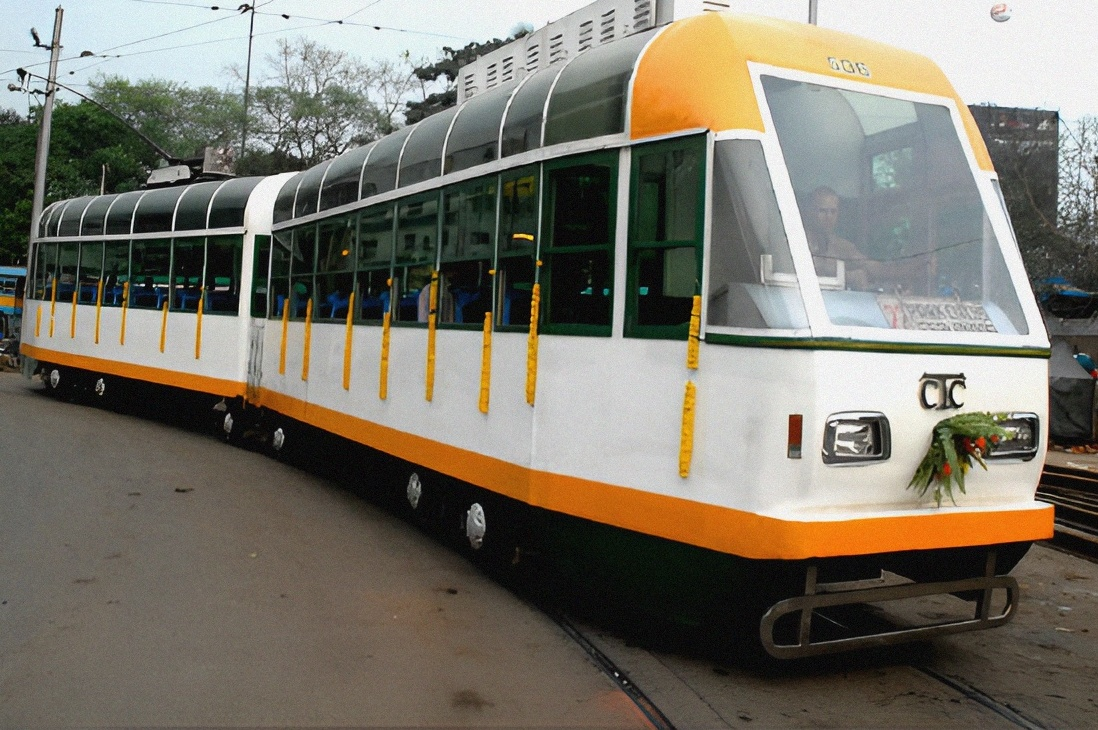
Kolkata Tram

The Kolkata Tram, built in 1873, is the oldest and the only operational tram in India. However, it is now largely seen as a heritage ride despite being a plausible urban transit that is also in profit. In addition to trains, trams were introduced in many cities in the late 19th century, though almost all of these systems were defunct eventually. Due to construction of Kolkata Metro's Green Line from Salt Lake to Howrah, just 14 kilometres (8.7 mi) of tramline is operational in Kolkata.

System	City	Lines	Length	Opened
Kolkata Tram	Kolkata	2	14 km (8.7 mi)	1873

=== Abandoned systems ===
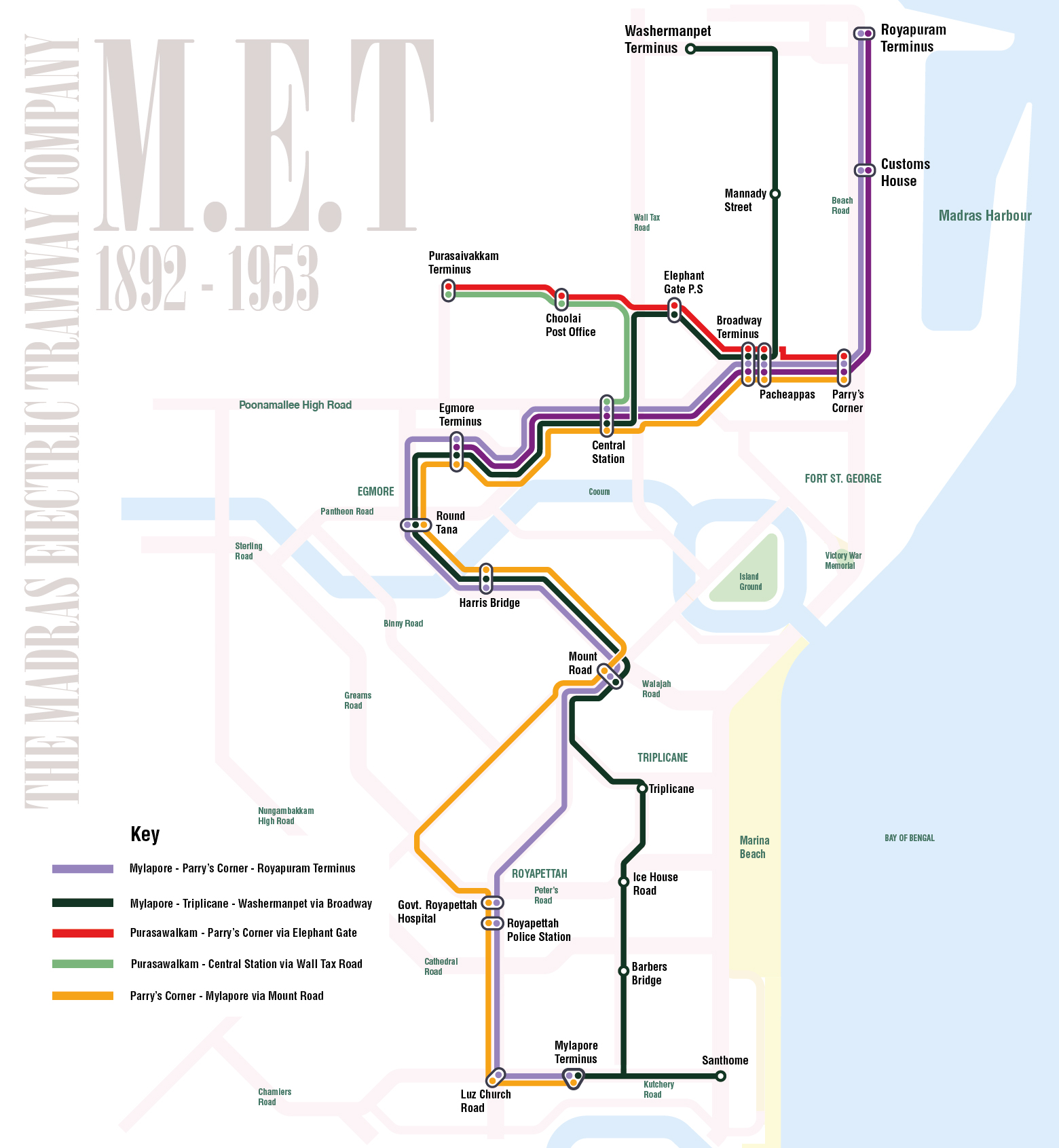
The now-defunct tram network in Chennai operated by the Madras Electric Tramway Company from 1892 to 1953

Defunct

System	City	Length	Opened	Discontinued
Bhavnagar Tram	Bhavnagar		1926	1960s
Chennai Tram	Chennai		1892	1953
Delhi Tram	Delhi		1908	1963
Kanpur Tram	Kanpur	6.04 km (3.75 mi)	1907	16 May 1933
Kochi Tram	Kochi		1907	1963
Mumbai Tram	Mumbai		1873	1964
Nashik Tram	Nashik	10 km (6.2 mi)	1889	1931
Patna Tram	Patna			1903

== Funicular railway ==
A 1.2 km cable-hauled rail line at Malanggad, near Kalyan in Thane district, Maharashtra was inaugurated in January 2026. This became India's longest funicular railway line. It replaced a strenuous multi-hour uphill climb to the shrine with a 7–10 minute ride and significantly improving access. The system can carry about 120 passengers per trip, and is expected to boost convenience, safety and visitor numbers in the area.

== Standardisation ==
=== Track gauge ===
Unlike broad gauge which forms the majority of the railway tracks in the sub-continent, metro rail lines in India are mainly of standard gauge. Projects like the Kolkata Metro and Delhi Metro used broad gauge for their earliest lines, but to procure modern foreign rakes and to adopt international standard, India used standard gauge for all the following lines.

=== NCMC ===
Part of the 'One Nation, One Card' policy of the Government of India, the National Common Mobility Card is an inter-operable transport card that enables users to pay for multiple kinds of transport charges like metros and buses, as well as do other things like retail shopping and money withdrawal. It is enabled through the RuPay card mechanism. The Ministry of Housing and Urban Affairs have been working on the card since 2006, when it was envisaged as a cashless fare payment system in accordance with the National Urban Transport Policy, 2006 (NUTP-2006). Its aim was to provide seamless connectivity to passengers across transit systems, leading to convenience, higher digital payments penetration, savings on closed loop card lifecycle management cost, and reduced operating cost.

== Manufacturing ==
There are multiple metro manufacturers in India. Under the Union Government's Make in India program, about 75% of the rolling stock procured for use on Indian metro systems are required to be manufactured in India.

1. BEML: 2,462 (32.1%)
2. ICF: 1,072 (14.0%)
3. Titagarh: 393 (5.12%)
4. Alstom: 1,223 (15.9%)
5. Bombardier: 1,047 (13.6%)
6. Hyndai Rotem: 903 (11.8%)
7. CRRC: 581 (7.56%)

Company	Customer	Total coaches
(India) BEML	Delhi Metro	1,444
(India) BEML	Mumbai Metro	576
(India) BEML	Namma Metro	300
(India) BEML	Kolkata Metro	102
(India) BEML	Jaipur Metro	40
BEML total	5	2,462
(Germany) (Canada) Bombardier	Delhi Metro	816
(Germany) (Canada) Bombardier	Agra Metro	87
(Germany) (Canada) Bombardier	Kanpur Metro	114
(Germany) (Canada) Bombardier	Meerut Metro	30
Bombardier total	4	1,047
(France) Alstom	Chennai Metro	286
(France) Alstom	Kochi Metro	75
(France) Alstom	Lucknow Metro	80
(France) Alstom	Mumbai Metro	248
(France) Alstom	Delhi Metro	312
(France) Alstom	Indore Metro	75
(France) Alstom	Bhopal Metro	81
(France) Alstom	Pune Metro	66
(France) Alstom	Meerut Metro	4
(France) Alstom	Delhi Meerut RRTS	80
Alstom total	8	1,223
(South Korea) Hyundai Rotem	Delhi Metro	486
(South Korea) Hyundai Rotem	Ahmedabad Metro	96
(South Korea) Hyundai Rotem	Namma Metro	150
(South Korea) Hyundai Rotem	Hyderabad Metro	171
Hyundai Rotem total	4	903
(India) ICF	Kolkata Metro	1072
ICF total	1	1072
(India) Titagarh Rail Systems	Namma Metro	216
(India) Titagarh Rail Systems	Pune Metro	102
(India) Titagarh Rail Systems	Surat Metro	72
(India) Titagarh Rail Systems	Patna Metro	3
Titagarh total	4	393
(China) CRRC	Namma Metro	216
(China) CRRC	Rapid Metro Gurgaon	36
(China) CRRC	Kolkata Metro	112
(China) CRRC	Mumbai Metro	48
(China) CRRC	Nagpur Metro	69
(China) CRRC	Noida Metro	76
(China) CRRC	Navi Mumbai Metro	24
CRRC total	7	581
7	20	7678

== Summary ==
=== Northern Region ===
==== Delhi NCR ====
System	Information		Currently operational	Currently under construction	Map	Website
Delhi Metro	Locale	Delhi	1 2 3 4 5 6 7 8 9 Airport Express	Phase 4; 7 Western extension (Maujpur); 8 Western extension (RK Ashram); New Lines; 10		DMRCL
Delhi Metro	Began operation	24 December 2002; 23 years ago	1 2 3 4 5 6 7 8 9 Airport Express	Phase 4; 7 Western extension (Maujpur); 8 Western extension (RK Ashram); New Lines; 10		DMRCL
Delhi Metro	Lines in operation	10	1 2 3 4 5 6 7 8 9 Airport Express	Phase 4; 7 Western extension (Maujpur); 8 Western extension (RK Ashram); New Lines; 10		DMRCL
Delhi Metro	No. of stations	243	1 2 3 4 5 6 7 8 9 Airport Express	Phase 4; 7 Western extension (Maujpur); 8 Western extension (RK Ashram); New Lines; 10		DMRCL
Delhi Metro	Network length	348.12 km (216 mi)	1 2 3 4 5 6 7 8 9 Airport Express	Phase 4; 7 Western extension (Maujpur); 8 Western extension (RK Ashram); New Lines; 10		DMRCL
Delhi Metro	Ridership	1.79 billion (2019)	1 2 3 4 5 6 7 8 9 Airport Express	Phase 4; 7 Western extension (Maujpur); 8 Western extension (RK Ashram); New Lines; 10		DMRCL
Delhi Suburban Railway	Locale	Delhi	Ring Line			Delhi EMU
Delhi Suburban Railway	Began operation	1975; 51 years ago	Ring Line			Delhi EMU
Delhi Suburban Railway	Lines in operation	1	Ring Line			Delhi EMU
Delhi Suburban Railway	No. of stations	21	Ring Line			Delhi EMU
Delhi Suburban Railway	Network length	35 km (22 mi)	Ring Line			Delhi EMU
Delhi Suburban Railway	Ridership	44,400 (2019)	Ring Line			Delhi EMU
Delhi Regional Rapid Transit	Locale	National Capital Region	Delhi–Meerut			NCRTC
Delhi Regional Rapid Transit	Began operation	2023; 3 years ago	Delhi–Meerut			NCRTC
Delhi Regional Rapid Transit	Lines in operation	1	Delhi–Meerut			NCRTC
Delhi Regional Rapid Transit	No. of stations	15	Delhi–Meerut			NCRTC
Delhi Regional Rapid Transit	Network length	82.15 km (51 mi)	Delhi–Meerut			NCRTC
Delhi Regional Rapid Transit	Ridership	NA	Delhi–Meerut			NCRTC
Noida Metro	Locale	Noida	Aqua Line			NMRC
Noida Metro	Began operation	29 December 2019; 6 years ago	Aqua Line			NMRC
Noida Metro	Lines in operation	1	Aqua Line			NMRC
Noida Metro	No. of stations	21	Aqua Line			NMRC
Noida Metro	Network length	29.7 km (18 mi)	Aqua Line			NMRC
Noida Metro	Ridership	0.58 million(2022)	Aqua Line			NMRC
Rapid Metro Gurgaon	Locale	Gurgaon	1			Kol Metro
Rapid Metro Gurgaon	Began operation	14 November 2013; 13 years ago	1			Kol Metro
Rapid Metro Gurgaon	Lines in operation	1	1			Kol Metro
Rapid Metro Gurgaon	No. of stations	11	1			Kol Metro
Rapid Metro Gurgaon	Network length	12.85 km (8 mi)	1			Kol Metro
Rapid Metro Gurgaon	Ridership	0.19 million(2018)	1			Kol Metro

==== Rajasthan ====
System	Information		Currently operational	Currently under construction	Map	Website
Jaipur Metro	Locale	Jaipur	1			JMRC
Jaipur Metro	Began operation	3 June 2015; 11 years ago	1			JMRC
Jaipur Metro	Lines in operation	1	1			JMRC
Jaipur Metro	No. of stations	21	1			JMRC
Jaipur Metro	Network length	11.97 km (7 mi)	1			JMRC
Jaipur Metro	Ridership	7.5 million	1			JMRC

=== Central Region ===
==== Madhya Pradesh ====
System	Information		Currently operational	Currently under construction	Map	Website
Bhoj Metro (Bhopal)	Locale	Bhopal		1	—	MPMRCL
Bhoj Metro (Bhopal)	Began operation	2024; 2 years ago		1	—	MPMRCL
Bhoj Metro (Bhopal)	Lines in operation	0 (1 UC)		1	—	MPMRCL
Bhoj Metro (Bhopal)	No. of stations	8		1	—	MPMRCL
Bhoj Metro (Bhopal)	Network length	6.22 km (4 mi)		1	—	MPMRCL
Bhoj Metro (Bhopal)	Ridership			1	—	MPMRCL
Indore Metro	Locale	Indore		1		MPMRCL
Indore Metro	Began operation	2024; 2 years ago		1		MPMRCL
Indore Metro	Lines in operation	0 (1 UC)		1		MPMRCL
Indore Metro	No. of stations	16		1		MPMRCL
Indore Metro	Network length	16.21 km (10 mi)		1		MPMRCL
Indore Metro	Ridership			1		MPMRCL

==== Uttar Pradesh ====
System	Information		Currently operational	Currently under construction	Map	Website
Lucknow Metro	Locale	Lucknow	1			UPMRC
Lucknow Metro	Began operation	5 September 2017; 9 years ago	1			UPMRC
Lucknow Metro	Lines in operation	1	1			UPMRC
Lucknow Metro	No. of stations	21	1			UPMRC
Lucknow Metro	Network length	22.878 km (14 mi)	1			UPMRC
Lucknow Metro	Ridership	22 million	1			UPMRC
Lucknow–Kanpur Suburban Railway	Locale	Uttar Pradesh	Lucknow–Kanpur Kanpur–Lucknow		—	
Lucknow–Kanpur Suburban Railway	Began operation	1867; 159 years ago	Lucknow–Kanpur Kanpur–Lucknow		—	
Lucknow–Kanpur Suburban Railway	Lines in operation	1	Lucknow–Kanpur Kanpur–Lucknow		—	
Lucknow–Kanpur Suburban Railway	No. of stations	16	Lucknow–Kanpur Kanpur–Lucknow		—	
Lucknow–Kanpur Suburban Railway	Network length	37 km (23 mi)	Lucknow–Kanpur Kanpur–Lucknow		—	
Lucknow–Kanpur Suburban Railway	Ridership		Lucknow–Kanpur Kanpur–Lucknow		—	
Barabanki–Lucknow Suburban Railway	Locale	Uttar Pradesh	Barabanki–Lucknow Lucknow–Barabanki		—	
Barabanki–Lucknow Suburban Railway	Began operation	30 June 2013; 13 years ago	Barabanki–Lucknow Lucknow–Barabanki		—	
Barabanki–Lucknow Suburban Railway	Lines in operation	1	Barabanki–Lucknow Lucknow–Barabanki		—	
Barabanki–Lucknow Suburban Railway	No. of stations	10	Barabanki–Lucknow Lucknow–Barabanki		—	
Barabanki–Lucknow Suburban Railway	Network length	72 km (45 mi)	Barabanki–Lucknow Lucknow–Barabanki		—	
Barabanki–Lucknow Suburban Railway	Ridership		Barabanki–Lucknow Lucknow–Barabanki		—	
Kanpur Metro	Locale	Kanpur	1	Expansion 1 Eastern extension (Naubasta)		UPMRC
Kanpur Metro	Began operation	28 December 2021; 4 years ago	1	Expansion 1 Eastern extension (Naubasta)		UPMRC
Kanpur Metro	Lines in operation	1	1	Expansion 1 Eastern extension (Naubasta)		UPMRC
Kanpur Metro	No. of stations	9	1	Expansion 1 Eastern extension (Naubasta)		UPMRC
Kanpur Metro	Network length	8.98 km (6 mi)	1	Expansion 1 Eastern extension (Naubasta)		UPMRC
Kanpur Metro	Ridership	-	1	Expansion 1 Eastern extension (Naubasta)		UPMRC
Agra Metro	Locale	Agra	1			UPMRC
Agra Metro	Began operation	2024; 2 years ago	1			UPMRC
Agra Metro	Lines in operation	1	1			UPMRC
Agra Metro	No. of stations	27	1			UPMRC
Agra Metro	Network length	29.65 km (18 mi)	1			UPMRC
Agra Metro	Ridership	-	1			UPMRC

=== Western Region ===
==== Gujarat ====
System	Information		Currently operational	Currently under construction	Map	Website
Ahmedabad Metro	Locale	Ahmedabad, Gandhinagar, GIFT City	1 2 3 4	Expansion; 3 4		GMRC
Ahmedabad Metro	Began operation	4 March 2019; 7 years ago	1 2 3 4	Expansion; 3 4		GMRC
Ahmedabad Metro	Lines in operation	4	1 2 3 4	Expansion; 3 4		GMRC
Ahmedabad Metro	No. of stations	47	1 2 3 4	Expansion; 3 4		GMRC
Ahmedabad Metro	Network length	58.87 km (37 mi)	1 2 3 4	Expansion; 3 4		GMRC
Ahmedabad Metro	Ridership	4 million (2024)	1 2 3 4	Expansion; 3 4		GMRC
Surat Metro	Locale	Surat		1 2	—	GMRC
Surat Metro	Began operation	2027; 1 year's time		1 2	—	GMRC
Surat Metro	Lines in operation	0 (2 UC)		1 2	—	GMRC
Surat Metro	No. of stations	38		1 2	—	GMRC
Surat Metro	Network length	40.35 km (25 mi)		1 2	—	GMRC
Surat Metro	Ridership			1 2	—	GMRC

==== Maharashtra ====
System	Information		Currently operational	Currently under construction	Map	Website
Mumbai Metro	Locale	Mumbai Metropolitan Region	1 2A 2B 3 7 9	Expansion; 2B Eastern extension (Mankhurd); 7A Southern extension (CSMIA); 9 Northern extension (Bhayander); New Lines; 4 4A 5 6 8 10 11 12		MMRDA; MMRC
Mumbai Metro	Began operation	8 June 2014; 12 years ago	1 2A 2B 3 7 9	Expansion; 2B Eastern extension (Mankhurd); 7A Southern extension (CSMIA); 9 Northern extension (Bhayander); New Lines; 4 4A 5 6 8 10 11 12		MMRDA; MMRC
Mumbai Metro	Lines in operation	4	1 2A 2B 3 7 9	Expansion; 2B Eastern extension (Mankhurd); 7A Southern extension (CSMIA); 9 Northern extension (Bhayander); New Lines; 4 4A 5 6 8 10 11 12		MMRDA; MMRC
Mumbai Metro	No. of stations	76	1 2A 2B 3 7 9	Expansion; 2B Eastern extension (Mankhurd); 7A Southern extension (CSMIA); 9 Northern extension (Bhayander); New Lines; 4 4A 5 6 8 10 11 12		MMRDA; MMRC
Mumbai Metro	Network length	90.95 km (57 mi)	1 2A 2B 3 7 9	Expansion; 2B Eastern extension (Mankhurd); 7A Southern extension (CSMIA); 9 Northern extension (Bhayander); New Lines; 4 4A 5 6 8 10 11 12		MMRDA; MMRC
Mumbai Metro	Ridership	0.54 million (2019)	1 2A 2B 3 7 9	Expansion; 2B Eastern extension (Mankhurd); 7A Southern extension (CSMIA); 9 Northern extension (Bhayander); New Lines; 4 4A 5 6 8 10 11 12		MMRDA; MMRC
Mumbai Suburban Railway	Locale	Mumbai Metropolitan Region	Central Harbour Trans-Harbour Port Western Vasai Road–Roha	Panvel–Karjat		Central Railway; Western Railway
Mumbai Suburban Railway	Began operation	16 April 1853; 173 years ago	Central Harbour Trans-Harbour Port Western Vasai Road–Roha	Panvel–Karjat		Central Railway; Western Railway
Mumbai Suburban Railway	Lines in operation	6	Central Harbour Trans-Harbour Port Western Vasai Road–Roha	Panvel–Karjat		Central Railway; Western Railway
Mumbai Suburban Railway	No. of stations	154	Central Harbour Trans-Harbour Port Western Vasai Road–Roha	Panvel–Karjat		Central Railway; Western Railway
Mumbai Suburban Railway	Network length	427.5 km (266 mi)	Central Harbour Trans-Harbour Port Western Vasai Road–Roha	Panvel–Karjat		Central Railway; Western Railway
Mumbai Suburban Railway	Ridership	2.92 billion (2019)	Central Harbour Trans-Harbour Port Western Vasai Road–Roha	Panvel–Karjat		Central Railway; Western Railway
Mumbai Monorail	Locale	Mumbai	1		—	MMRDA
Mumbai Monorail	Began operation	2 February 2014; 12 years ago	1		—	MMRDA
Mumbai Monorail	Lines in operation	1	1		—	MMRDA
Mumbai Monorail	No. of stations	27	1		—	MMRDA
Mumbai Monorail	Network length	19.54 km (12 mi)	1		—	MMRDA
Mumbai Monorail	Ridership		1		—	MMRDA
Navi Mumbai Metro	Locale	Navi Mumbai	1			CIDCO
Navi Mumbai Metro	Began operation	17 November 2023; 3 years ago	1			CIDCO
Navi Mumbai Metro	Lines in operation	1	1			CIDCO
Navi Mumbai Metro	No. of stations	11	1			CIDCO
Navi Mumbai Metro	Network length	11.10 km (7 mi)	1			CIDCO
Navi Mumbai Metro	Ridership		1			CIDCO
Pune Metro	Locale	Pune Metropolitan Region	1 2 3	Expansion; 1 Northern extension (Bhakti Shakti) Southern extension (Katraj); 2 Eastern extension (Vithalwadi) Western extension (Chandni Chowk)		PMR
Pune Metro	Began operation	6 March 2022; 4 years ago	1 2 3	Expansion; 1 Northern extension (Bhakti Shakti) Southern extension (Katraj); 2 Eastern extension (Vithalwadi) Western extension (Chandni Chowk)		PMR
Pune Metro	Lines in operation	3	1 2 3	Expansion; 1 Northern extension (Bhakti Shakti) Southern extension (Katraj); 2 Eastern extension (Vithalwadi) Western extension (Chandni Chowk)		PMR
Pune Metro	No. of stations	44	1 2 3	Expansion; 1 Northern extension (Bhakti Shakti) Southern extension (Katraj); 2 Eastern extension (Vithalwadi) Western extension (Chandni Chowk)		PMR
Pune Metro	Network length	56.3 km (35 mi)	1 2 3	Expansion; 1 Northern extension (Bhakti Shakti) Southern extension (Katraj); 2 Eastern extension (Vithalwadi) Western extension (Chandni Chowk)		PMR
Pune Metro	Ridership		1 2 3	Expansion; 1 Northern extension (Bhakti Shakti) Southern extension (Katraj); 2 Eastern extension (Vithalwadi) Western extension (Chandni Chowk)		PMR
Pune Suburban Railway	Locale	Pune Metropolitan Region	Pune–Lonavala		—	
Pune Suburban Railway	Began operation	11 March 1978; 48 years ago	Pune–Lonavala		—	
Pune Suburban Railway	Lines in operation	1	Pune–Lonavala		—	
Pune Suburban Railway	No. of stations	18	Pune–Lonavala		—	
Pune Suburban Railway	Network length	63 km (39 mi)	Pune–Lonavala		—	
Pune Suburban Railway	Ridership		Pune–Lonavala		—	
Nagpur Metro	Locale	Nagpur	1 2			metrorailnagpur
Nagpur Metro	Began operation	8 March 2019; 7 years ago	1 2			metrorailnagpur
Nagpur Metro	Lines in operation	2	1 2			metrorailnagpur
Nagpur Metro	No. of stations	37	1 2			metrorailnagpur
Nagpur Metro	Network length	40 km (25 mi)	1 2			metrorailnagpur
Nagpur Metro	Ridership	0.73 (million)	1 2			metrorailnagpur

=== Eastern Region ===
==== Bihar ====
System	Information		Currently operational	Currently under construction	Map	Website
Patna Metro	Locale	Patna	2	1 Expansion; 2		
Patna Metro	Began operation	7 October 2025; 13 months ago	2	1 Expansion; 2		
Patna Metro	Lines in operation	1 (2 UC)	2	1 Expansion; 2		
Patna Metro	No. of stations	26	2	1 Expansion; 2		
Patna Metro	Network length	33.91 km (21 mi)	2	1 Expansion; 2		
Patna Metro	Ridership		2	1 Expansion; 2		

==== West Bengal ====
System	Information		Currently operational	Currently under construction	Map	Website
Kolkata Metro	Locale	Kolkata metropolitan area	1 2 3 6 4	Expansion; 3 Northern extension (Esplanade); 6 Northern extension (Jai Hind (Kolkata airport)); 4 North Eastern extension (Micheal Nagar)		KMRC
Kolkata Metro	Began operation	24 October 1984; 42 years ago	1 2 3 6 4	Expansion; 3 Northern extension (Esplanade); 6 Northern extension (Jai Hind (Kolkata airport)); 4 North Eastern extension (Micheal Nagar)		KMRC
Kolkata Metro	Lines in operation	4	1 2 3 6 4	Expansion; 3 Northern extension (Esplanade); 6 Northern extension (Jai Hind (Kolkata airport)); 4 North Eastern extension (Micheal Nagar)		KMRC
Kolkata Metro	No. of stations	58	1 2 3 6 4	Expansion; 3 Northern extension (Esplanade); 6 Northern extension (Jai Hind (Kolkata airport)); 4 North Eastern extension (Micheal Nagar)		KMRC
Kolkata Metro	Network length	73.42 km (46 mi)	1 2 3 6 4	Expansion; 3 Northern extension (Esplanade); 6 Northern extension (Jai Hind (Kolkata airport)); 4 North Eastern extension (Micheal Nagar)		KMRC
Kolkata Metro	Ridership	1.952 billion	1 2 3 6 4	Expansion; 3 Northern extension (Esplanade); 6 Northern extension (Jai Hind (Kolkata airport)); 4 North Eastern extension (Micheal Nagar)		KMRC
Kolkata Suburban Railway	Locale	Kolkata metropolitan area	Chord link Circular Eastern South Eastern Sealdah South			South Eastern Railway; Eastern Railway
Kolkata Suburban Railway	Began operation	15 August 1854; 172 years ago	Chord link Circular Eastern South Eastern Sealdah South			South Eastern Railway; Eastern Railway
Kolkata Suburban Railway	Lines in operation	5	Chord link Circular Eastern South Eastern Sealdah South			South Eastern Railway; Eastern Railway
Kolkata Suburban Railway	No. of stations	458	Chord link Circular Eastern South Eastern Sealdah South			South Eastern Railway; Eastern Railway
Kolkata Suburban Railway	Network length	1,501 km (933 mi)	Chord link Circular Eastern South Eastern Sealdah South			South Eastern Railway; Eastern Railway
Kolkata Suburban Railway	Ridership	2.1 billion (2019)	Chord link Circular Eastern South Eastern Sealdah South			South Eastern Railway; Eastern Railway
Trams in Kolkata	Locale	Kolkata	Gariahat–Esplanade Shyambazar–Esplanade 15 Routes non-operational due to ongoing Green construction		—	
Trams in Kolkata	Began operation	24 February 1873; 153 years ago	Gariahat–Esplanade Shyambazar–Esplanade 15 Routes non-operational due to ongoing Green construction		—	
Trams in Kolkata	Lines in operation	2	Gariahat–Esplanade Shyambazar–Esplanade 15 Routes non-operational due to ongoing Green construction		—	
Trams in Kolkata	No. of stations	N/A	Gariahat–Esplanade Shyambazar–Esplanade 15 Routes non-operational due to ongoing Green construction		—	
Trams in Kolkata	Network length	14 km (9 mi)	Gariahat–Esplanade Shyambazar–Esplanade 15 Routes non-operational due to ongoing Green construction		—	
Trams in Kolkata	Ridership	15 thousand	Gariahat–Esplanade Shyambazar–Esplanade 15 Routes non-operational due to ongoing Green construction		—	

=== Southern Region ===
==== Karnataka ====
System	Information		Currently operational	Currently under construction	Map	Website
Namma Metro (Bengaluru)	Locale	Bengaluru	1 2 3 4	Extension 4 Northern extension (Nagawara); New Lines; 5 6 7 8		BMRC
Namma Metro (Bengaluru)	Began operation	20 October 2011; 15 years ago	1 2 3 4	Extension 4 Northern extension (Nagawara); New Lines; 5 6 7 8		BMRC
Namma Metro (Bengaluru)	Lines in operation	4	1 2 3 4	Extension 4 Northern extension (Nagawara); New Lines; 5 6 7 8		BMRC
Namma Metro (Bengaluru)	No. of stations	88	1 2 3 4	Extension 4 Northern extension (Nagawara); New Lines; 5 6 7 8		BMRC
Namma Metro (Bengaluru)	Network length	103.6 km (64 mi)	1 2 3 4	Extension 4 Northern extension (Nagawara); New Lines; 5 6 7 8		BMRC
Namma Metro (Bengaluru)	Ridership	232.8 million (2023)	1 2 3 4	Extension 4 Northern extension (Nagawara); New Lines; 5 6 7 8		BMRC
Bengaluru Suburban Railway	Locale	Bangalore Metropolitan Region		New Lines; Mallige Kanaka		K-Ride
Bengaluru Suburban Railway	Began operation	2026; 0 years ago		New Lines; Mallige Kanaka		K-Ride
Bengaluru Suburban Railway	Lines in operation	0 (2 UC)		New Lines; Mallige Kanaka		K-Ride
Bengaluru Suburban Railway	No. of stations	59		New Lines; Mallige Kanaka		K-Ride
Bengaluru Suburban Railway	Network length	160.45 km (100 mi)		New Lines; Mallige Kanaka		K-Ride
Bengaluru Suburban Railway	Ridership	NA		New Lines; Mallige Kanaka		K-Ride

==== Kerala ====
System	Information		Currently operational	Currently under construction	Map	Website
Kochi Metro	Locale	Kochi	1			KMRC
Kochi Metro	Began operation	17 June 2017; 9 years ago	1			KMRC
Kochi Metro	Lines in operation	1	1			KMRC
Kochi Metro	No. of stations	25	1			KMRC
Kochi Metro	Network length	28.12 km (17 mi)	1			KMRC
Kochi Metro	Ridership	36.5 million	1			KMRC
Kochi Water Metro	Locale	Kochi	6			KWM
Kochi Water Metro	Began operation	23 April 2023; 3 years ago	6			KWM
Kochi Water Metro	Lines in operation	6	6			KWM
Kochi Water Metro	No. of stations	10	6			KWM
Kochi Water Metro	Network length	76 km (47 mi)	6			KWM
Kochi Water Metro	Ridership	34,000	6			KWM

==== Tamil Nadu ====
System	Information		Currently operational	Currently under construction	Map	Website
Chennai Metro	Locale	Chennai	1 2 4	Expansion; 1 Southern extension (Kilambakkam); New Lines; 3 5		CMRL
Chennai Metro	Began operation	29 June 2015; 11 years ago	1 2 4	Expansion; 1 Southern extension (Kilambakkam); New Lines; 3 5		CMRL
Chennai Metro	Lines in operation	3	1 2 4	Expansion; 1 Southern extension (Kilambakkam); New Lines; 3 5		CMRL
Chennai Metro	No. of stations	52	1 2 4	Expansion; 1 Southern extension (Kilambakkam); New Lines; 3 5		CMRL
Chennai Metro	Network length	68.8 km (43 mi)	1 2 4	Expansion; 1 Southern extension (Kilambakkam); New Lines; 3 5		CMRL
Chennai Metro	Ridership	0.8 billion	1 2 4	Expansion; 1 Southern extension (Kilambakkam); New Lines; 3 5		CMRL
Chennai MRTS	Locale	Chennai	Chennai Beach-Velachery-St Thomas Mount			CMDA
Chennai MRTS	Began operation	1 November 1995; 31 years ago	Chennai Beach-Velachery-St Thomas Mount			CMDA
Chennai MRTS	Lines in operation	1	Chennai Beach-Velachery-St Thomas Mount			CMDA
Chennai MRTS	No. of stations	18	Chennai Beach-Velachery-St Thomas Mount			CMDA
Chennai MRTS	Network length	19.34 km (12 mi)	Chennai Beach-Velachery-St Thomas Mount			CMDA
Chennai MRTS	Ridership	164.25 million	Chennai Beach-Velachery-St Thomas Mount			CMDA
Chennai Suburban Railway	Locale	Chennai	North Line West Line West-North Line West-South Line South Line South-West Line Chennai MRTS Circular Line			SR
Chennai Suburban Railway	Began operation	1931; 95 years ago	North Line West Line West-North Line West-South Line South Line South-West Line Chennai MRTS Circular Line			SR
Chennai Suburban Railway	Lines in operation	8	North Line West Line West-North Line West-South Line South Line South-West Line Chennai MRTS Circular Line			SR
Chennai Suburban Railway	No. of stations	300+	North Line West Line West-North Line West-South Line South Line South-West Line Chennai MRTS Circular Line			SR
Chennai Suburban Railway	Network length	1,200 km (746 mi)	North Line West Line West-North Line West-South Line South Line South-West Line Chennai MRTS Circular Line			SR
Chennai Suburban Railway	Ridership	912.57 million	North Line West Line West-North Line West-South Line South Line South-West Line Chennai MRTS Circular Line			SR

==== Telangana ====
System	Information		Currently operational	Currently under construction	Map	Website
Hyderabad Metro	Locale	Hyderabad	1 2 3			HMRL
Hyderabad Metro	Began operation	29 November 2017; 8 years ago	1 2 3			HMRL
Hyderabad Metro	Lines in operation	3	1 2 3			HMRL
Hyderabad Metro	No. of stations	57	1 2 3			HMRL
Hyderabad Metro	Network length	67.21 km (42 mi)	1 2 3			HMRL
Hyderabad Metro	Ridership	178 million	1 2 3			HMRL
Hyderabad MMTS	Locale	Hyderabad	HF Line HL Line FL Line SF Line SB Line		—	
Hyderabad MMTS	Began operation	9 August 2003; 23 years ago	HF Line HL Line FL Line SF Line SB Line		—	
Hyderabad MMTS	Lines in operation	5	HF Line HL Line FL Line SF Line SB Line		—	
Hyderabad MMTS	No. of stations	44	HF Line HL Line FL Line SF Line SB Line		—	
Hyderabad MMTS	Network length	90 km (56 mi)	HF Line HL Line FL Line SF Line SB Line		—	
Hyderabad MMTS	Ridership	0.8 billion	HF Line HL Line FL Line SF Line SB Line		—	

== See also ==
- Urban rail transit
  - List of metro systems
  - List of monorail systems
  - List of tram and light rail transit systems
  - List of suburban and commuter rail systems
- List of bus rapid transit systems in India
- Rail transport in India
- List of railway lines in India
- High-speed rail in India
- List of high-speed railway lines in India
- Dedicated freight corridors in India
- Aerial lift in India
- List of metro networks in Uttar Pradesh
- Ministry of Railways
