= Gorakhpur Metro =

Public transport system in Gorakhpur, India

Gorakhpur Metrolite

Overview
- Owner: Uttar Pradesh Metro Rail Corporation (UPMRC)
- Locale: Gorakhpur, Uttar Pradesh, India
- Transit type: Metrolite
- Number of lines: 2
- Number of stations: 27
- Chief executive: Kumar Keshav

Operation
- Operation will start: unknown
- Character: Elevated
- Train length: 3 coaches

Technical
- System length: 27.41 km (17.03 mi)
- No. of tracks: 2
- Track gauge: 1,435 mm (4 ft 8 1/2 in) standard gauge

The Gorakhpur Metrolite is a light rapid transit system proposed for the city of Gorakhpur, Uttar Pradesh, India. The network will consist of 2 elevated lines serving 27 stations with a total length of 27.41 kilometres. The project is estimated to cost ₹4,672 crore (US$500 million). It is currently unknown when the project will be complete.

== History ==
The Government of Uttar Pradesh appointed the Uttar Pradesh Metro Rail Corporation to build a metro system in Gorakhpur in 2017. Rail India Technical and Economic Service prepared the feasibility study and the detailed project report for the project and submitted it to the corporation in March 2019. The report was approved by the state cabinet on 9 October 2020.

The Public Investment Board approved the first phase of the project on 22 November 2021, and the project is expected to be completed by 2024.

== Route network ==
The first line would be constructed from Shyam Nagar to Sooba Bazaar covering a distance of 16.95 km and comprise 16 stations whereas the second line would be constructed from Gulariha to Kachehri Chauraha covering a distance of 10.46 km and comprise 11 stations.

=== Line 1 (Shyam Nagar – Sooba Bazar) ===
Length: 16.95 km

Alignment: Elevated

No. of Stations: 16

Stations:

- Shyam Nagar
- Bargadwa
- Shastri Nagar
- Nathmalpur
- Gorakhnath Mandir
- Hazaripur
- Dharmshala (Interchange)
- Gorakhpur Railway Station
- University
- Mohaddipur
- Ramgarh Lake
- AIIMS
- Malviya Nagar
- MMM Engineering College
- Divya Nagar
- Sooba Bazar

=== Line 2 (Gulariha – Kachehri Chauraha) ===
Length: 10.46 km

Alignment: Elevated

No. of Stations: 11

Stations:

- Gulariha
- BRD Medical College
- Mugalaha
- Khanjanchi Bazar
- Basharatpur
- Ashok Nagar
- Vishnu Nagar
- Asuran Chowk
- Dharamshala (Interchange)
- Gol Ghar
- Kachehri Chauraha

== See also ==
- Urban rail transit in India
  - Kanpur Metro
  - Lucknow Metro
- Meerut Metro
- Noida Metro
