= Delhi Metrolite =

Planned light rail transit in Delhi, India

Overview
- Status: Planned
- Owner: Delhi Metro
- Locale: Delhi
- Termini: Kirti Nagar; Bamnoli Village/Dwarka Sector 28
- Stations: 21

Service
- Type: Light rail transit
- System: Delhi Metro
- Operator(s): Delhi Metro Rail Corporation

Technical
- Line length: 19.09 km (11.86 mi)
- Number of tracks: 2
- Character: At-Grade
- Track gauge: 1,435 mm (4 ft 8 1/2 in) standard gauge
- Signalling: CBTC

The Delhi Metrolite is a planned 19.09 km (11.86 mi) Metrolite system with 21 stations that will connect Kirti Nagar to Bamnoli Village via Mayapuri, Hari Nagar, Tihar Jail, Dwarka Sector 2, Sector 7, Sector 6, Sector 20, and Sector 23, and the Dwarka ECC. It will be designed as per MoHUA's Metrolite specifications, and will be much cheaper to construct because of its lower speeds and carrying capacities compared to regular metros. Detailed Project Report (DPR) for this line was approved by DMRC's board in October 2019, and is currently awaiting the Delhi Government's approval.

== Stations ==
The stations proposed for the Metrolite are:

Delhi Metrolite
No.	Station Name		Phase	Opening	Interchange Connection	Station Layout	Platform Level Type	Depot Connection
No.	English	Hindi	Phase	Opening	Interchange Connection	Station Layout	Platform Level Type	Depot Connection
1	Kirti Nagar	कीर्ति नगर	4		Blue Line; Green Line	At Grade	Side	None
2	Saraswati Garden	सरस्वती गार्डन	4			At Grade	Side	None
3	Mayapuri Bus Depot	मायापुरी बस डिपो	4			At Grade	Side	None
4	Mayapuri	मायापुरी	4		Pink Line	At Grade	Side	None
5	Hari Nagar Block BE	हरि नगर ब्लॉक बीई	4			At Grade	Side	None
6	Mayapuri Industrial Area	मायापुरी औद्योगिक क्षेत्र	4			At Grade	Side	None
7	Mayapuri Industrial Area - II	मायापुरी औद्योगिक क्षेत्र - २	4			At Grade	Side	None
8	Lajwanti Garden	लाजवंती गार्डन	4			At Grade	Side	None
9	Shivpuri	शिवपुरी	4			At Grade	Side	None
10	Dabri Village	डाबरी विलेज	4			At Grade	side	None
11	Sitapuri Extension	सीतापुरी एक्सटेंशन	4			At Grade	Side	None
12	Mahavir Enclave	महावीर एन्क्लेव	4			At Grade	Side	None
13	Dwarka Sector 2	द्वारका सेक्टर २	4			At Grade	Side	None
14	Dwarka Sector 7	द्वारका सेक्टर ७	4			At Grade	Side	None
15	Dwarka Sector 6	द्वारका सेक्टर ६	4			At Grade	Side	None
16	Dwarka Sector 10	द्वारका सेक्टर १०	4			At Grade	Side	None
17	Dwarka Sector 20	द्वारका सेक्टर २०	4			At Grade	Side	None
18	Dwarka Sector 23	द्वारका सेक्टर २३	4			At Grade	Side	None
19	Dhul Siras Village	धुल सिरस विलेज	4			At Grade	Side	None
20	Yashobhoomi Dwarka Sector 25	यशोभूमि द्वारका सेक्टर २५	4		Airport Express	At Grade	Side	None
21	Dwarka Sector 28	द्वारका सेक्टर २८	4			At Grade	Side	None

== See also ==
- Metrolite
- Delhi Metro
- DMRC
