= Varanasi Metro =

Light rail transit system

Overview
- Owner: Uttar Pradesh Metro Rail Corporation
- Locale: Varanasi, Uttar Pradesh, India
- Transit type: Light rail
- Number of lines: 2 (Proposed)
- Number of stations: 26 (Proposed)

Operation
- Train length: 3 coaches

Technical
- System length: 29.235 km (18.166 mi)
- Track gauge: 1,435 mm (4 ft 8 1/2 in) standard gauge
- Average speed: 35 km/h (22 mph)
- Top speed: 90 km/h (56 mph)

The Varanasi Metro is a light rail transit system proposed for the city of Varanasi, Uttar Pradesh, India. The proposed system consists of 2 corridors that span from BHEL (Tarna, Shivpur) to Banaras Hindu University (19.35 km) and Benia Bagh to Sarnath (9.885 km). The feasibility study of the project was done by RITES and was completed in June 2015.

There will be 26 stations including 20 underground stations and six elevated stations. The two corridors will have total length of 29.235 km consisting of 23.467 km underground, while 5.768 km elevated. The state government allocated 150 crores rupees in February 2019 for the ongoing metro projects in the state.

== History ==
Uttar Pradesh state government led by Akhilesh Yadav had planned to introduce a metro rail system in cities of Varanasi, Meerut and Agra. Government has hired an infrastructure development enterprise, RITES to conduct a traffic analysis. The government had planned to approach RITES for a detailed project including feasibility and financial viability.

== Cost ==
The total estimated completion cost for construction of Varanasi Metro was estimated to be ₹17,227 Crores including taxes and duties. The project is envisaged to be undertaken as a joint venture (JV) project between the Government of India (GoI) and the Government of Uttar Pradesh (GoUP) with 50:50 equity partnerships. To maintain the financial viability of the project, additional grants have been proposed from the two governments in addition to their equity contribution.

== Route ==
Two corridors had been planned by Varanasi Development Authority (VDA) were:

- Corridor 1: BHEL to Banaras Hindu University and (19.35 km)

A total of 17 Metro stations had been planned (4 Elevated: 3.845 km; 13 Underground: 15.505 km) for the BHEL to BHU corridor.

S.No.	Stations	Station level
1	BHEL (Tarna)	Elevated
2	Tarna	Elevated
3	Shivpur	Elevated
4	Sangam Colony	Elevated
5	Gilat Bazar	Underground
6	Bhojubeer	Underground
7	Orderly Bazar	Underground
8	Collectorate	Underground
9	Nadesar	Underground
10	Varanasi Junction	Underground
11	Kashi Vidyapeeth	Underground
12	Rathyatra	Underground
13	Benia Bagh	Underground
14	Kashi Vishwanath (Chitranjan Park)	Underground
15	Bangali Tola	Underground
16	Ratnakar Park	Underground
17	Tulsi Manas Mandir	Underground
18	Banaras Hindu University (BHU)	Underground

- Corridor 2: Benia Bagh to Sarnath (9.885 km)

A total of 9 Metro stations (2 Elevated: 1.923 km; 7 Underground: 7.962 km) had been proposed for the Benia Bagh to Sarnath corridor.

S.No.	Stations	Station level
1	Benia Bagh	Underground
2	Kotwali	Underground
3	Machodri Park	Underground
4	Kashi Bus Depot	Underground
5	Jalalipura	Underground
6	Punchkroshi	Elevated
7	Ashapur	Elevated
8	Havelia	Underground
9	Sarnath	Underground

The first corridor from Banaras Hindu University (BHU) to BHEL will take about four years, while the second corridor from Benia Bagh to Sarnath will be completed in two years. However, the date of the beginning of the project is yet to be decided.

== Detailed Project Report findings ==
The Government of Uttar Pradesh (GoUP) had assigned Uttar Pradesh Metro Rail Corporation (UPMRC) the responsibility of 'Coordinator' for preparation of Detailed Project Report (DPR) for Metro in Varanasi. Varanasi Development Authority (VDA) is the nodal agency for preparation of this DPR for Varanasi Metro. For this purpose M/s RITES, a Govt of India Undertaking, has been engaged for preparing the DPR. Work on preparation of DPR for Metro in Varanasi commenced in May, 2015 involving series of site visits by LMRC team led by LMRC and RITES along with VDA officials. Through successive site visits, engineering surveys and review meetings/ discussions with the Commissioner, Varanasi and VDA officials, Metro corridors have been finalised for Varanasi city and DPR prepared.

Under the coordination of Uttar Pradesh Metro Rail Corporation (UPMRC), M/s RITES had been able to prepare the DPR. The DPR envisages two corridors with a total length of 29.235 km for the Varanasi Metro Rail project. The first corridor that spreads from BHEL to BHU covers 19.35 km with an elevated stretch of 3.845 km and an underground stretch of 15.505 km. The second corridor consisting of 9.885 km length from Benia Bagh to Sarnath covers an elevated section of 1.923 km and an underground section of 7.962 km.

According to the DPR, a maintenance depot for both the corridors had been proposed at Ganeshpur covering an area of 13.2 hectares of land. Metro in Varanasi will be a three-car unit train running on standard gauge track on Communication Based Train Control (CBTC) signalling technology with continuous automatic train control permitting an operational headway of 90 seconds.

== Status updates ==
- May 2016: Detailed Project Report approved.
- September 2017: Detailed Project Report (DPR) dropped due new metro rail policy. New DPR to be created by RITES.
- December 2017: New DPR to be commissioned under 'New Metro Rail Policy'.
- June 2018: Varanasi Metro Rail Project rejected due to lack of funds.
- February 2019: In UP Budget 2019, CM Yogi Adityanath allocated ₹150 crores.
- August 2020: Metro rail found infeasible; light metro proposed.
- September 2020: Detailed Project Report (DPR) to be reviewed for metro rail.
- February 2021: Uttar Pradesh government allocates ₹100 crores for the metro.
- July 2024: Central government reject proposal of metro system in Varanasi.

== See also ==
- Meerut Metro
- Noida Metro
- Delhi–Meerut RRTS
