= Uttar Pradesh Metro Rail Corporation =

Company that operates the Lucknow Metro in Uttar Pradesh, India

Uttar Pradesh Metro Rail Corporation Limited (UPMRC)
- Type: State owned SPV
- Industry: Public transport
- Predecessor: Lucknow Metro Rail Corporation
- Founded: 25 November 2013; 12 years ago
- Headquarters: Vipin Khand, Gomti Nagar, Lucknow, Uttar Pradesh, India
- Area served: Uttar Pradesh
- Key people: Sushil Kumar, IRSE Managing Director)
- Services: Lucknow Metro; Kanpur Metro; Agra Metro
- Owner: Government of India (50%); Government of Uttar Pradesh (50%)
- Website: upmetrorail.com

The Uttar Pradesh Metro Rail Corporation (UPMRC) is a 50:50 joint venture company between Government of India and Government of Uttar Pradesh that operates the Lucknow Metro, Kanpur Metro and Agra Metro. The Varanasi Metro, Prayagraj Metro, Gorakhpur Metro, and Bareilly Metro are proposed by UPMRC. The company's headquarters is at Vipin Khand, Gomti Nagar in Lucknow, Uttar Pradesh, India.

The Noida Metro, although located in Uttar Pradesh, is not operated by UPMRC and is instead operated by the Noida Metro Rail Corporation (NMRC), a separate company.

Similarly, Meerut Metro and Delhi Meerut RRTS also located in Uttar Pradesh are not operated by UPMRC and are instead operated by National Capital Region Transport Corporation (NCRTC).

== History ==
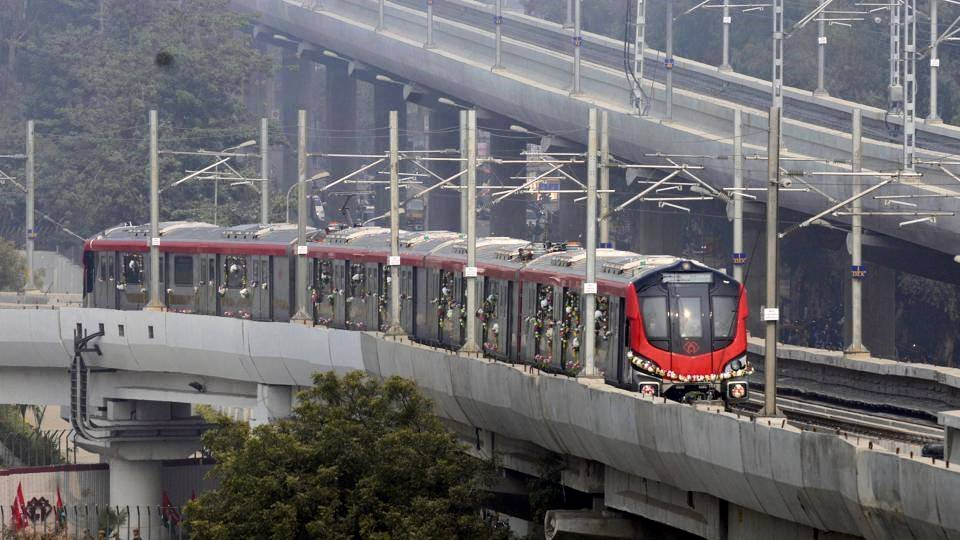
The Lucknow Metro The first metro operated by UPMRC.

The LMRC was formed as a special purpose vehicle by the Government of Uttar Pradesh in 2013 to build and operate the Lucknow Metro.

The formation of LMRC was formally approved by the Cabinet of Uttar Pradesh Government in June 2013.

The SPV was incorporated under Companies Act, 1956 on 25 November 2013, and it got the certificate to commence business on 24 December 2013. The authorised capital of the company was decided to be ₹2,000 crore (US$214 million).

In 2016, to speed up clearance processes for Lucknow Metro, LMRC became a 50:50 joint venture between the Government of India and the Government of Uttar Pradesh.

As a result, the LMRC board was reconstituted with five nominee directors being nominated by both Government of India and Government of Uttar Pradesh each, apart from the three full-time directors. Additionally, the Chief Secretary of Uttar Pradesh was replaced by the Union Urban Development Secretary as the ex-officio Chairman of LMRC.

In 2017. the Lucknow Metro was inaugurated and opened to the public.

In 2018, LMRC was reconstituted to cover and implement other metro projects in the state and renamed as Uttar Pradesh Metro Rail Corporation.

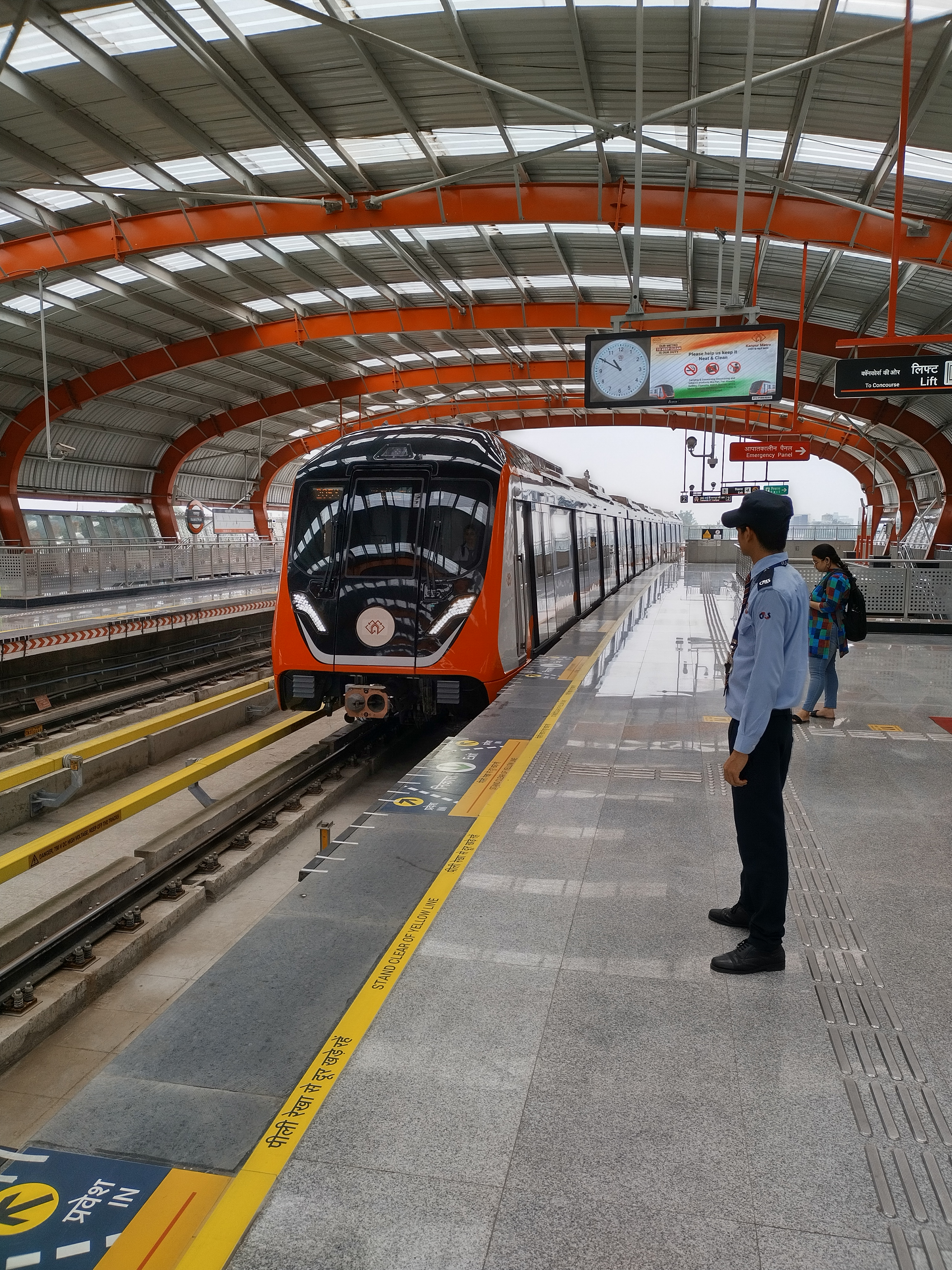
Kanpur Metro was the fastest built metro system in the world.

In 2021, the Kanpur Metro was open to the public. This was the fastest built and commissioned metro system in the world built in 24 months.

On 6 March 2024, PM Narendra Modi inaugurated the priority corridor of the Agra Metro.

== Systems ==
=== Rapid transit ===
==== Operational systems ====
As of 11 October 2026

List of current operational systems in Uttar Pradesh
System	Locale	Lines operational	Stations	Length		Opened	Annual ridership (in millions)
System	Locale	Lines operational	Stations	Operational	Under construction	Opened	Annual ridership (in millions)
Agra Metro	Agra	1	6	5.20 km	24.47 km	6 March 2024	—N/a
Kanpur Metro	Kanpur	1	14	16.00 km	15.05 km	28 December 2021	11.06 (2024)
Lucknow Metro	Lucknow	1	21	22.90 km	—N/a	5 September 2017	31.15 (2024^{*})
Total		3	41	44.1 km	39.52 km	—N/a	42.21 million

Table note

^* Indicates ridership figures based on the fiscal year rather than the calendar year.

==== Systems in development ====
As of 6 October 2026

Under construction
Centre approved DPR
Central DPR appraisal
Centre rejected DPR
State approved DPR
DPR submitted
DPR under preparation
On hold

System	Locale	Length		Construction began	Planned opening
System	Locale	Under construction	Planned	Construction began	Planned opening
Prayagraj Metro	Prayagraj		44 km (27 mi)	TBD	TBD
Total			44 km (27 mi)		

=== Light rail ===
==== Systems in development ====
Under construction
Centre approved DPR
Central DPR appraisal
Centre rejected DPR
State approved DPR
DPR submitted
DPR under preparation
On hold

System	Locale	Length		Construction began	Planned opening
System	Locale	Under construction	Planned	Construction began	Planned opening
Gorakhpur Metro	Gorakhpur		27.41 km (17.03 mi)	TBD	TBD
Bareilly Metro	Bareilly		20 km (12 mi)	TBD	TBD
Varanasi Metro	Varanasi		29.23 km (18.16 mi)	TBD	TBD
Jhansi Metro	Jhansi		18 km (11 mi)	TBD	TBD
Mathura Metro	Mathura		TBD	TBD	TBD
Ayodhya Metro	Ayodhya		TBD	TBD	TBD
Total			94.64 km (58.81 mi)		

== Services ==
Different cities in Uttar Pradesh where some form of Urban Transit System Exists

Apart from operating Lucknow Metro, Kanpur Metro, UPMRC also provides consultancy services for Metro projects in Uttar Pradesh.

UPMRC in association with RITES has prepared Detailed Project Reports (DPRs) for Metro in various cities of Uttar Pradesh. UPMRC is also currently working as an interim consultant for implementation of Agra Metro, Prayagraj Metro, and Varanasi Metro and also Gorakhpur Metro projects.

Along with this number of ropeway projects are also under implementation stage including Varanasi Ropeway Project.

Kanpur Metro has faced criticism for its low ridership. It had daily average ridership of only 8,000 to 10,000 passengers a day.

Noida, Greater Noida and Ghaziabad Metro are run by Delhi Metro Rail Corporation. While Meerut Metro and Delhi Meerut RRTS are operated by National Capital Region Transport Corporation.

Another RRTS connecting Ghaziabad, Noida, Greater Noida and Jewar is expected to also start construction, Geographical survey and DPR preparation is currently underway. The Uttar Pradesh government will fund 50% of the project, while 20% will come from the Centre and the remaining 30 will be borne by Yeida, and Greater Noida.
