= Jammu Metro =

Rapid transit system in India

Overview
- Area served: Jammu
- Locale: Jammu, Jammu and Kashmir, India
- Transit type: light rail transit
- Number of lines: 2 (planned), 2 extensions in phase 2
- Number of stations: 23 (phase 1)
- Website: pdf

Operation
- Began operation: TBD

Technical
- System length: 23 km (14 mi)
- Electrification: 25 kV 50 Hz AC overhead catenary

The Jammu Metro is a proposed light rail transit system for the city of Jammu in the Indian Union Territory of Jammu and Kashmir. The project has been proposed by the Housing and Urban Development Department of the Government of Jammu and Kashmir and is estimated to cost Rs. 4825 crores in phase 1. The proposed system will have a total route length of 43.50 km, consisting of 4 lines and 22 stations, and will be completed in two phases. The expected completion date for the project is 2026.

The Jammu and Kashmir state government has announced plans to introduce a metro rail system in the city of Jammu. To conduct a traffic analysis, the government hired the services of the infrastructure development enterprise RITES. Additionally, the government approached the Delhi Metro Rail Corporation to prepare a detailed project report, including feasibility and financial viability.

== History ==
It was expected that the official plan for the Jammu Metro will be launched in 2022-23, with construction to follow thereafter. This will also coincide with the construction of the Srinagar Metro.

As of July 4, 2023, the Jammu and Kashmir administration has proposed the introduction of MetroLite lines in Srinagar and Jammu cities, as reported by The Indian Express. This development comes as a significant step towards enhancing the public transport system in the region. The proposal includes a 25 km metro line in Srinagar and a 23 km line in Jammu. With the aim of boosting connectivity and convenience for commuters, the J&K Lieutenant Governor, Manoj Sinha, has expressed the administration's focus on implementing the MetroLite system due to its cost-effectiveness and viability. This proposal has been sent to the Ministry of Housing and Urban Affairs for ministerial consultation.

== Routes ==
The Jammu Metro project will be completed in two separate phases.

=== Phase 1 ===
The first phase will consist of two lines.

==== Line 1 : Bantalab - Satwari - Greater Kailash ====
- Length : 17 km
- Station : 17
- Type : Elevated
- Depot: Bantalab

==== Line 2: Udheywala - Exhibition Ground ====
- Length: 6 km
- Station: 6
- Type: Elevated
- Depot: Udheywala

== Present status ==
- 2021 Aug: RITES submitted the Detailed Project Report (DPR) to the Ministry of Home and Urban Affairs for both Jammu and Srinagar metro projects simultaneously estimated to cost around ₹10,559 crores, the tendering will be initiated once the project is approved by PMO and Union Cabinet.

== See also ==
- Srinagar Metro
- Strategic rail lines of India
- Railway in Himachal, Jammu and Kashmir, and Ladakh
- Aerial lift in India
- Urban rail transit in India
