= Malanggad =

Hill fort in Maharashtra, India

- Malang Gad
- Part of Matheran Hill Range
- Thane district, Maharashtra
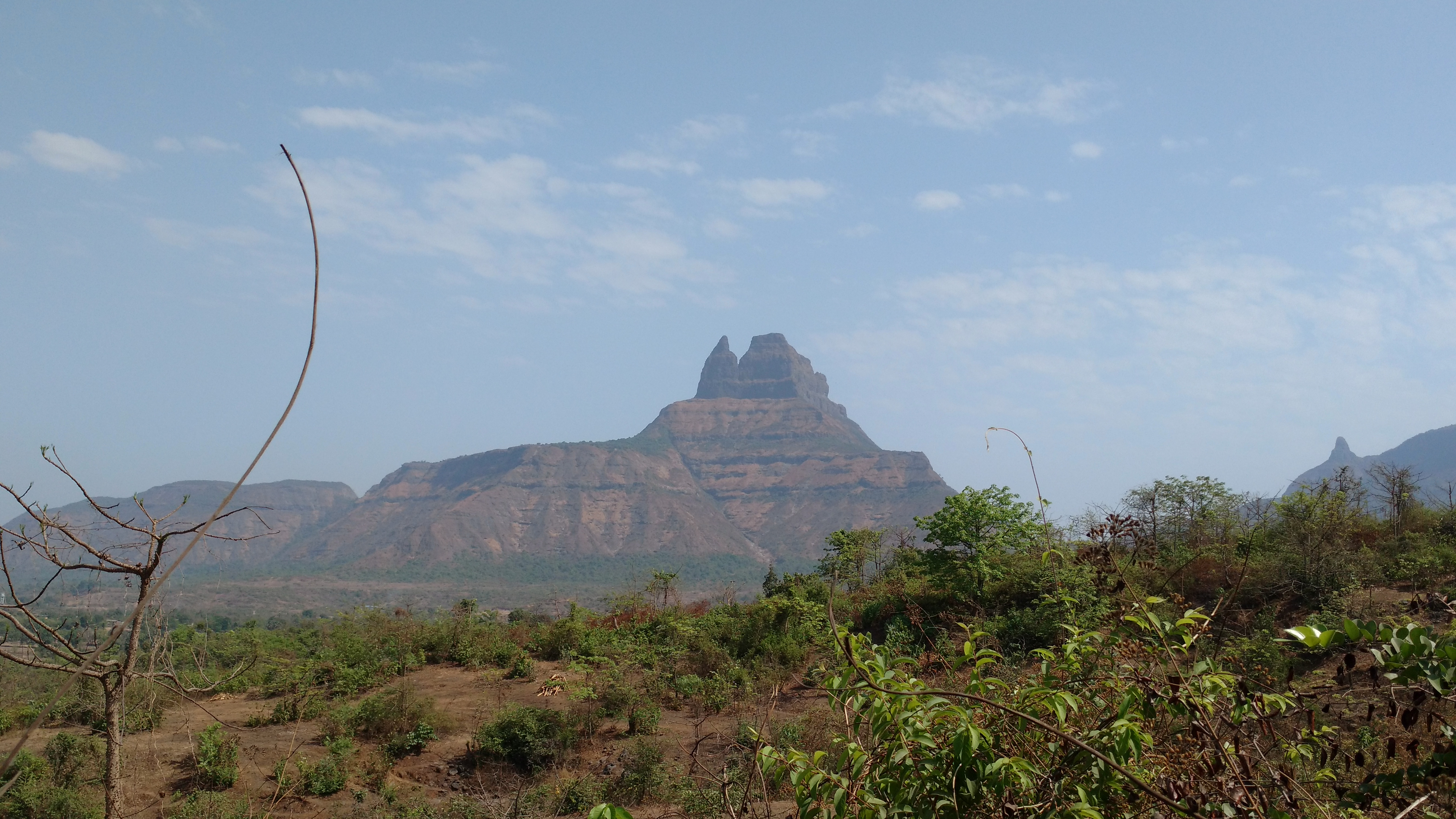
- Malang Gad

Site information
- Type: Hill fort
- Owner: Government of India
- Open to the public: Yes
- Condition: Ruins

Location
- Shown within Maharashtra
- Coordinates: 19°06′36.2″N 73°10′41.5″E
- Height: 3200 Ft.

Site history
- Materials: Stone

Malanggad is a hill fort located in the Matheran Hill Range, Thane District, Maharashtra, India.

== History ==
Malanggad was built by the King Naladev of the Maurya Dynasty in the seventh century. The fort was initially captured by the Marathas in the 17th century and was later conquered over by the British.

Nearby Kalyan East 15 km, the reinforcements arrived in early October as Colonel Hartley and Captain Jameson and their troops advanced on Malanggad and finally defeated the Marathas.

== Major features ==
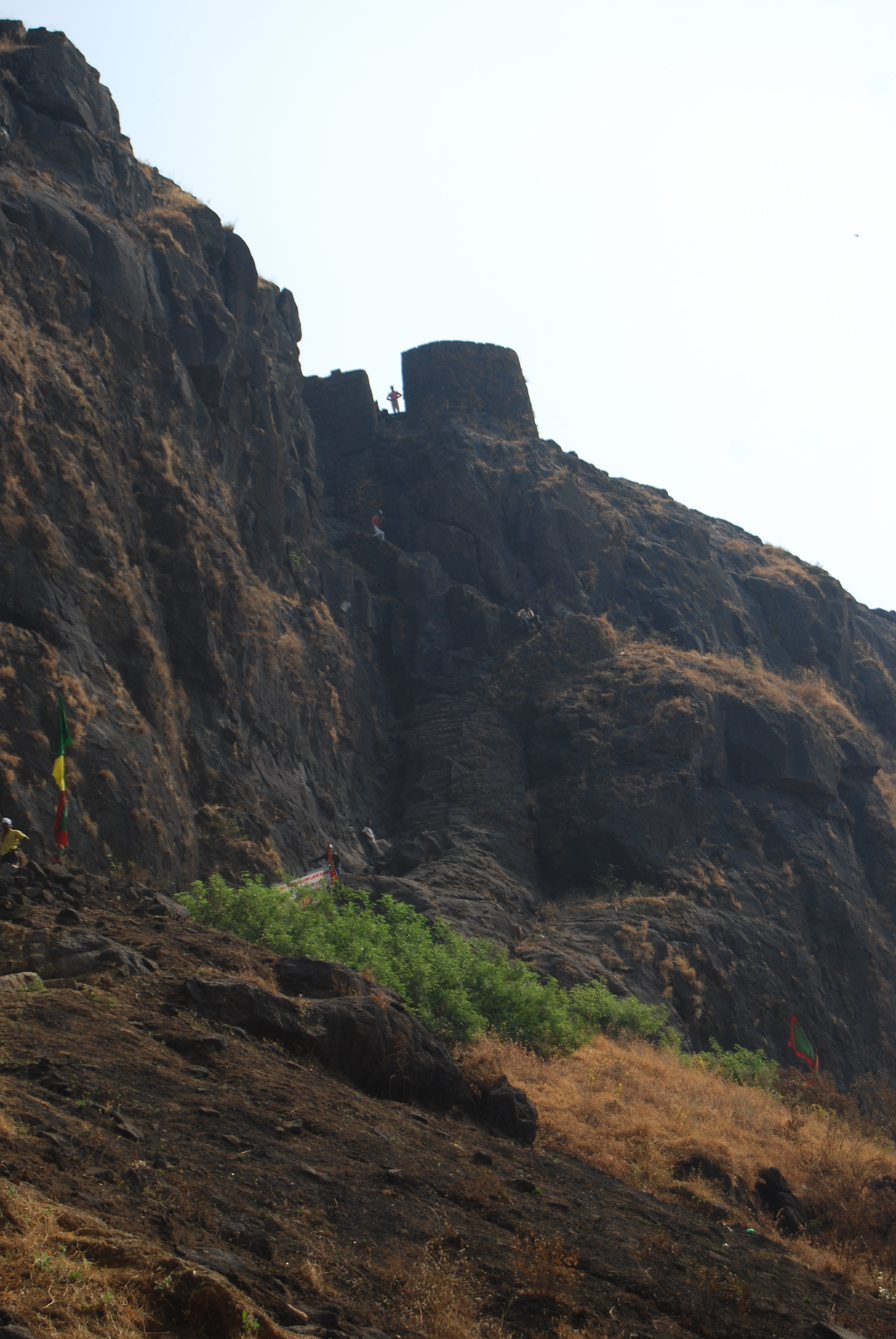
Malanggad bastion of the middle level

Malanggad is built on three levels. The lowest level is a plateau which is 1000 feet broad and 2500 feet long on which stands the Dargah of a Sufi saint - Haji Malang. At the other end of the plateau is the Panchi Pir which lies almost at the edge of the rock and is named after the five pirs who accompanied Shree Malang Gad. This plateau is called Pir Machi.

The next higher level is called the Sone Machi as it is the lower part of the fort. This is a projection of rock that is 70 feet broad and 100 feet long. It is shaped like an elephant trunk.

Malang Gad is different from other forts in Maharashtra. Whereas other forts have several gates and multiple watchtowers, the art of the main gate itself. With a wall with no machicolations to fire at the enemy and no fortifications, Malang Gad is one of the few forts to depend completely on natural aspects of the hill to defend itself.
