= Chennai Metrolite =

Planned light rail transit in Chennai, India

Overview
- Status: Planned
- Owner: Chennai Metro
- Locale: Chennai
- Termini: Tambaram; Velachery

Service
- Type: Light rail transit
- System: Chennai Metro
- Operator(s): Chennai Metro Rail Limited

Technical
- Line length: 15 km (9.3 mi)
- Number of tracks: 2
- Character: At-grade
- Track gauge: 1,435 mm (4 ft 8 1/2 in) standard gauge
Route map
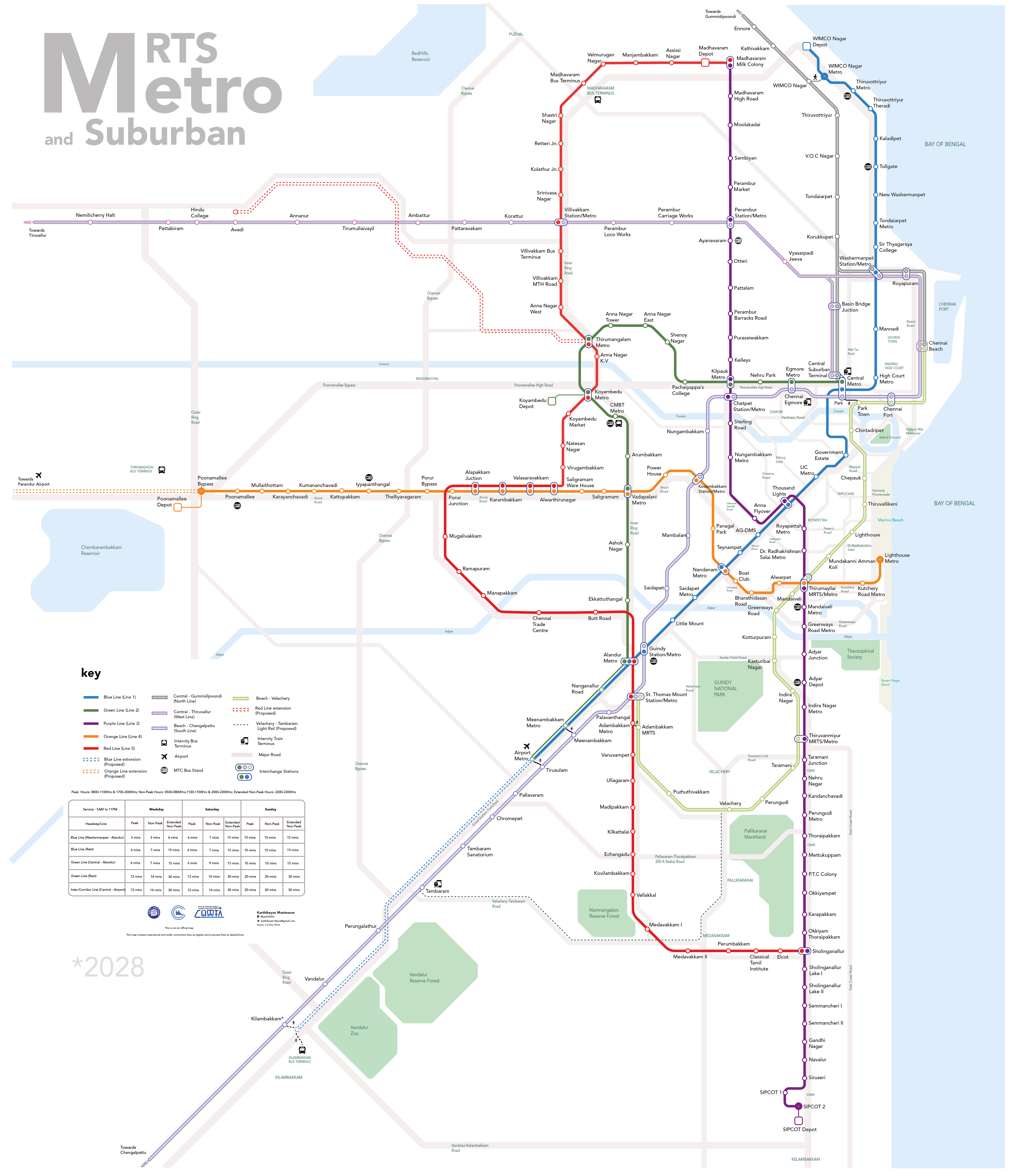

Chennai Metrolite is a planned 15 km (9.3 mi) Metrolite system in Chennai, Tamil Nadu. The line will connect Tambaram and Velachery in South Chennai. The system will be constructed and operated by Chennai Metro Rail Limited. The stations will be at-grade and the line is planned to link the existing urban transit lines of Chennai Metro and Chennai Mass Rapid Transit System.

The system will be designed as per MoHUA's Metrolite specifications and will be cheaper to construct because of its lower speeds and carrying capacities compared to regular metros. In 2023, the feasibility study for the project was commissioned by the Chennai Unified Metropolitan Transport Authority.
