= Srinagar Metro =

Subway system in India

Overview
- Owner: Srinagar Development Authority
- Area served: Srinagar
- Locale: Srinagar, Jammu and Kashmir, India
- Transit type: light rail transit
- Number of lines: 2 (planned)
- Number of stations: 28

Operation
- Began operation: 2027
- Train length: 3 coaches

Technical
- System length: 25 km (16 mi)
- Electrification: 25 kV 50 Hz AC overhead catenary

The Srinagar Metro is a light rail transit planned for the city of Srinagar, Jammu and Kashmir. The plans for the Srinagar Metro have been finalised with the work expected to start once the project gets nod from union cabinet. The proposed network will have two corridors. Each corridor of Srinagar metro will have 12 stations each with the total cost expected to be ₹5,559 crore.

Former Delhi Metro Rail Corporation (DMRC) chief E. Sreedharan, who is popularly known as 'Metro Man' following his success in Konkan railway and Delhi Metro, was appointed as the project head.

== History ==
Jammu and Kashmir state government has planned to introduce a metro rail system in cities of Srinagar and Jammu which respectively serve as Summer and winter capital of the state. The government had hired an infrastructure development enterprise, RITES to conduct a traffic analysis. The government has planned to approach Delhi Metro Rail Corporation for a detailed project including feasibility and financial viability.

As of 4th July 2023, the Jammu and Kashmir administration has proposed the introduction of MetroLite lines in Srinagar and Jammu cities, as reported by The Indian Express. This development aims to improve the public transportation system in the region and will be the first metro lines to be established in Jammu and Kashmir. The proposed project includes a 25 km line in Srinagar and a 23 km line in Jammu. The administration's decision to opt for the MetroLite system, with its lower capital and operational costs, reflects the unique requirements and feasibility of the region. The implementation of these metro lines is expected to enhance connectivity and provide commuters with a more convenient and efficient mode of transportation.

== Route ==
Two elevated corridors have been planned in Phase 1, with an estimated ridership of 200,000 by the year 2027. The Line 2 is planned to be extended until Srinagar Airport in phase 2. The depot is set to be constructed near HMT Junction of Line 1.

Srinagar Metrolite Line-1 (HMT Junction - Indira Nagar)
No.	Station Name		Phase	Opening	Interchange Connection	Station Layout	Platform Level Type	Depot Connection
No.	English	کٲشُر	Phase	Opening	Interchange Connection	Station Layout	Platform Level Type	Depot Connection
1	HMT Junction	ایچ ایم ٹی جنٛکشن	1	2027	–	Elevated	Side	HMT Junction Depot
2	Parimpora	پٲرِمپوٗر	1	2027	–	Elevated	Side	None
3	Bus stand	بس سٹینٛڈ	1	2027	–	Elevated	Side	None
4	Qamarwari	قَمَروور	1	2027	–	Elevated	Side	None
5	Gazarzoo	گازارزو	1	2027	–	Elevated	Side	None
6	Rathpora	رتھپوٗر	1	2027	–	Elevated	Side	None
7	Batmaloo	بَٹہٕ مالیُٛن	1	2027	–	Elevated	Side	None
8	Secretariat	سیکریٹیریٹ	1	2027	–	Elevated	Side	None
9	Lal Chowk	لال چوک	1	2027	–	Elevated	Side	None
10	Munshi Nagar	مُنشی نگر	1	2027	Line 2	Elevated	Side	None
11	Sonwar	سۄنوار	1	2027	–	Elevated	Side	None
12	Indiranagar	اِنٛدرانگر	1	2027	–	Elevated	Side	None
Srinagar Metrolite Line-2 (Osmanabad - Hazoori Bagh)
1	Osmanabad	عثمان آباد	1	2027	–	Elevated	Side	None
2	Hazratbal Crossing	حضرت بل کراسِنٛگ	1	2027	–	Elevated	Side	None
3	Soura	صۆوُر	1	2027	–	Elevated	Side	None
4	Skims	سِکمٕس	1	2027	–	Elevated	Side	None
5	Nalbal Bridge	نل بل کٔدٕل	1	2027	–	Elevated	Side	None
6	Mill Stop	مِل سٹاپ	1	2027	–	Elevated	Side	None
7	Hawal Chowk	حَوَل	1	2027	–	Elevated	Side	None
8	Jama Masjid	جامع مسجد	1	2027	–	Elevated	Side	None
9	Khaniyar	خانیار	1	2027	–	Elevated	Side	None
10	Nowpora	ناؤ پوٗر	1	2027	–	Elevated	Side	None
11	Munshi Nagar	مُنشی نگر	1	2027	Line 1	Elevated	Side	None
12	Hazoori Bagh	حۆضوٗری باغ	1	2027	–	Elevated	Side	None

== Present status ==
- 2021 Aug: RITES submitted the Detailed Project Report (DPR) to the Ministry of Home and Urban Affairs for both Jammu and Srinagar metro projects simultaneously estimated to cost around ₹10,559 crores, the tendering will be initiated once the project is approved by PMO and Union Cabinet.

== See also ==
- Jammu Metro
- Strategic rail lines of India
- Railway in Himachal, Jammu and Kashmir, and Ladakh
- Urban rail transit in India
- Aerial lift in India
