= Prayagraj Metrolite =

Rapid transit system in Prayagraj, Uttar Pradesh, India

Prayagraj Metro
- UPMRC Logo

Overview
- Owner: Uttar Pradesh Metro Rail Corporation
- Locale: Prayagraj, Uttar Pradesh, India
- Transit type: Rapid transit
- Number of lines: 2
- Number of stations: 39
- Website: https://www.lmrcl.com/

Operation
- Began operation: Under Planning

Technical
- System length: 44 km (27 mi)

The Prayagraj Metro , formerly Prayagraj Metrolite, is a proposed Rapid transit system for the city of Prayagraj (Allahabad), Uttar Pradesh, India. The proposed system will consist of two lines, an east–west line from Manauri to Trivenipuram, and a north–south line from Shantipuram in Jalalapur to Karchana. Both lines will be about 20 kilometres (12 mi) long. There will be a total of 39 stations, 20 on the east–west line and 19 on the north–south line. The project is expected to cost ₹8000 crore.

== Status updates ==
- Feb 2019: UP government allocates ₹ 175 Cr to start preliminary work in budget
- Mar 2019: Detailed Project Report (DPR) provided to state government for approval by Prayagraj Development Authority.
- July 2021: State government approves the light rail metro system for Prayagraj.
- October 2025 State government upgraded the metrolite system to a metro system.

== See also ==
- Meerut Metro
- Noida Metro
- Delhi–Meerut RRTS
