= RITES Limited =

Indian public sector undertaking

RITES
- Formerly: Rail India Technical and Economic Service (1974-2008)
- Type: Public
- Traded as: NSE: RITES; BSE: 541556
- Industry: Infrastructure
- Founded: 26 April 1974; 52 years ago
- Headquarters: Sector-29, Gurgaon, Haryana, India
- Area served: Worldwide
- Key people: Mr. Rahul Mithal (Chairman & MD)
- Services: Consulting
- Revenue: ▲₹2,539 crore (US$260 million) (2023-24)
- Operating income: ▲₹526 crore (US$55 million) (2023-24)
- Net income: ▲₹495 crore (US$51 million) (2023-24)
- Total assets: ▲₹5,661 crore (US$590 million) (2023-24)
- Total equity: ▲₹2,609 crore (US$270 million) (2023-24)
- Owner: Government of India (72.20%)
- Number of employees: 2611 (March 2024)
- Website: RITES

RITES Limited is an Indian public sector undertaking which operates under the Ministry of Railways, Government of India. Incorporated in April 1974, it is designated as a Navratna Central Public Sector Enterprise (CPSE). The company provides consultancy, engineering, and project delivery services in the field including railways, highways, metros, tunnels, bridges, urban development, buildings, airports, ports, ropeways, inland waterways, multimodal logistics parks and green mobility.

== History ==
RITES was established in 1974 to provide consultancy services to the Indian Railways, including feasibility studies, project planning, and infrastructure development. Over the years, its scope expanded to cover other transport sectors and overseas markets. The company has undertaken more than 5,000 projects in India and over 55 countries across Asia, Africa, and Latin America. In 2018, RITES became a publicly traded company listed on the Bombay Stock Exchange and the National Stock Exchange of India. The company has also been involved in the planning and design of high-speed rail networks, dedicated freight corridors, and urban metro systems.

== Operations ==
=== Engineering Design and Project Reports ===
RITES' engineering design activities include the engineering consultancy, feasibility studies, design and planning, environmental assessments, and project management services across multiple sectors. It also prepares detailed project reports, environmental and social impact assessments, and undertakes geotechnical investigations and surveys.

=== Project Management Services ===
The company undertakes project management through advisory services for project appraisal, procurement assistance, project management consultancy, third‑party inspections and authority engineer roles.

=== Export of Rolling Stock ===
It is engaged in the export of rolling stock such as locomotives, coaches, wagons and other railway equipment, providing commissioning, warranty and spare parts support, incidental services etc.

=== Leasing of Locomotives and O&M of Rail Assets ===
RITES operates a fleet of over 90 locomotives provided to non-railway clients, including but not limited to ports, cement plants, coal plants, power plants, container deports, project sites etc. RITES also manages operations and maintenance (O&M) services of rail assets at more than 30 sites across India.

=== Turnkey Construction Work ===
In turnkey construction, the company executes Engineering, Procurement and Construction contracts covering railway electrification, stations, bridges, tunnels, depots and related facilities.

=== Quality Control and Inspection ===
Its quality control and inspection services involve third‑party inspection and quality assurance for components used in transport infrastructure.

== Subsidiaries and Joint Ventures ==
Key subsidiaries and joint ventures include:

- Railway Energy Management Company Limited – Focused on renewable energy and energy efficiency in the railway sector.
- SAIL–RITES Bengal Wagon Industry Pvt. Ltd. – Engaged in wagon manufacturing and rehabilitation.
- RITES Afrika Pty. Ltd. – A transport infrastructure consultancy in Botswana and other African markets.

== Selected Projects ==
=== Domestic ===
- Bogibeel Bridge, Assam – India's longest combined road–rail bridge.
- Pir Panjal Railway Tunnel, Jammu & Kashmir – One of India's longest railway tunnels.
- Ahmedabad Metro, Gujarat – Technical advisory and project management.
- Shivamogga Airport, Karnataka – Airport design and implementation.
- Ayodhya Dham Station, Uttar Pradesh – Redevelopment integrating modern and heritage features.
- Bundelkhand Expressway, Uttar Pradesh – Technical consultancy.
- Vaishno Devi Ropeway, Jammu & Kashmir – Ropeway consultancy.

=== International ===
RITES has worked on railway modernisation and transport infrastructure in Sri Lanka, Bangladesh, Mozambique, Mauritius, and other countries in Africa and Latin America.

== Exports ==
RITES’ is involved in the export operations to international markets across Asia, Africa, and Latin America. It has supplied more than 175 locomotives and 900 coaches over the years and has undertaken projects involving the export of rolling stock to various African and South Asian countries from Sri Lanka, Angola, Bangladesh, Myanmar to Mozambique, a Cape Gauge country.
