= List of Kanpur Metro stations =

Kanpur Metro is the 14th metro system in India.

The Kanpur metro as of now covers a distance of 16 km with nine elevated stations and 5 underground stations.

It is built and operated by the Uttar Pradesh Metro Rail Corporation (UPMRC) . Its first section was inaugurated on 28 December 2021 and opened for public on 28 December 2021, by Prime Minister Narendra Modi.

Another 5 underground station from Chunniganj to Kanpur Central was inaugurauted by PM Modi on 30 May 2025.

== Metro stations ==
†	Terminal station
*	Transfer station
††	Transfer station to Indian Railways / ISBT
**	Transfer station to other lines and Indian Railways / ISBT

Station name		Line	Opened	Station layout	Platform layout	Notes	Refs
English	Hindi	Line	Opened	Station layout	Platform layout	Notes	Refs
Agriculture University†	कृषि विश्वविद्यालय	Blue Line	Under Construction	Underground	Island	–	
Bada Chauraha	बड़ा चौराहा	Orange Line	30 May 2025	Underground	Island	For Z square mall	
Bara Devi	बारा देवी	Orange Line	Under Construction	Elevated	Side	For Baradevi Temple	
Barra-7	बर्रा-7	Blue Line	Under Construction	Elevated	Side	–	
Barra-8†	बर्रा-8	Blue Line	Under Construction	Elevated	Side	–	
Baudh Nagar	बौद्ध नगर	Orange Line	Under Construction	Elevated	Side	–	
Chunniganj	चुन्नीगंज	Orange Line	30 May 2025	Underground	Island	–	
Double Pulia	डबल पुलिया	Blue Line	Under Construction	Underground	Island	–	
Geeta Nagar	गीता नगर	Orange Line	28 December 2021	Elevated	Side	–	
Gurudev Chauraha	गुरुदेव चौराहा	Orange Line	28 December 2021	Elevated	Side	–	
IIT Kanpur†	आई आई टी कानपुर	Orange Line	28 December 2021	Elevated	Side	For IIT Kanpur	
Jhakarkati††	झकरकटी	Orange Line	Under Construction	Underground	Island	Transfer station for Kanpur ISBT	
Kakadeo	काकादेव	Blue Line	Under Construction	Underground	Island	–	
Kalyanpur††	कल्याणपुर	Orange Line	28 December 2021	Elevated	Side	Transfer station for Kalianpur railway station	
Kanpur Central††	कानपुर सेंट्रल	Orange Line	30 May 2025	Underground	Island	Transfer station for Kanpur Central railway station	
Kidwai Nagar	किदवई नगर	Orange Line	Under Construction	Elevated	Side	–	
LLR Hospital	एल एल आर हाॅस्पिटल	Orange Line	28 December 2021	Elevated	Side	For Hallet Hospital	
Moti Jheel	मोती झील	Orange Line	28 December 2021	Elevated	Side	–	
Naubasta†	नौबस्ता	Orange Line	Under Construction	Elevated	Side	–	
Naveen Market	नवीन मार्केट	Orange Line	30 May 2025	Underground	Island	–	
Nayaganj	नयागंज	Orange Line	30 May 2025	Underground	Island	–	
Rawatpur**	रावतपुर	Orange Line	28 December 2021	Elevated	Side	Transfer station for Rawatpur railway station, Blue Line, Rave@Moti Mall	
Rawatpur**	रावतपुर	Blue Line	Under Construction	Underground	Island	Transfer station for Rawatpur railway station, Blue Line, Rave@Moti Mall	
Shastri Chowk	शास्त्री चौक	Blue Line	Under Construction	Elevated	Side	–	
SPM Hospital	एस पी एम हॉस्पिटल	Orange Line	28 December 2021	Elevated	Side	–	
Transport Nagar	ट्रांसपोर्ट नगर	Orange Line	Under Construction	Underground	Island	–	
Vasant Vihar	वसंत विहार	Orange Line	Under Construction	Elevated	Side	–	
Vijay Nagar Chauraha	विजय नगर चौराहा	Blue Line	Under Construction	Elevated	Side	–	
Vishwavidyalaya	विश्वविद्यालय	Orange Line	28 December 2021	Elevated	Side	For Kanpur University	

== Statistics ==
Total number of metro stations	14
Number of interchange stations	0
Number of elevated stations	9
Number of underground stations	5
Number of stations at-grade	0
Number of under construction stations	15

== See also ==
- Kanpur Metro
- Uttar Pradesh State Road Transport Corporation
- List of rapid transit systems in India
- List of Metro Systems
- Kochi Metro
- Jaipur Metro
- Mumbai Metro
- Kolkata Metro
