= Kalyanpur metro station =

Kanpur Metro's Orange Line metro station

Kalyanpur
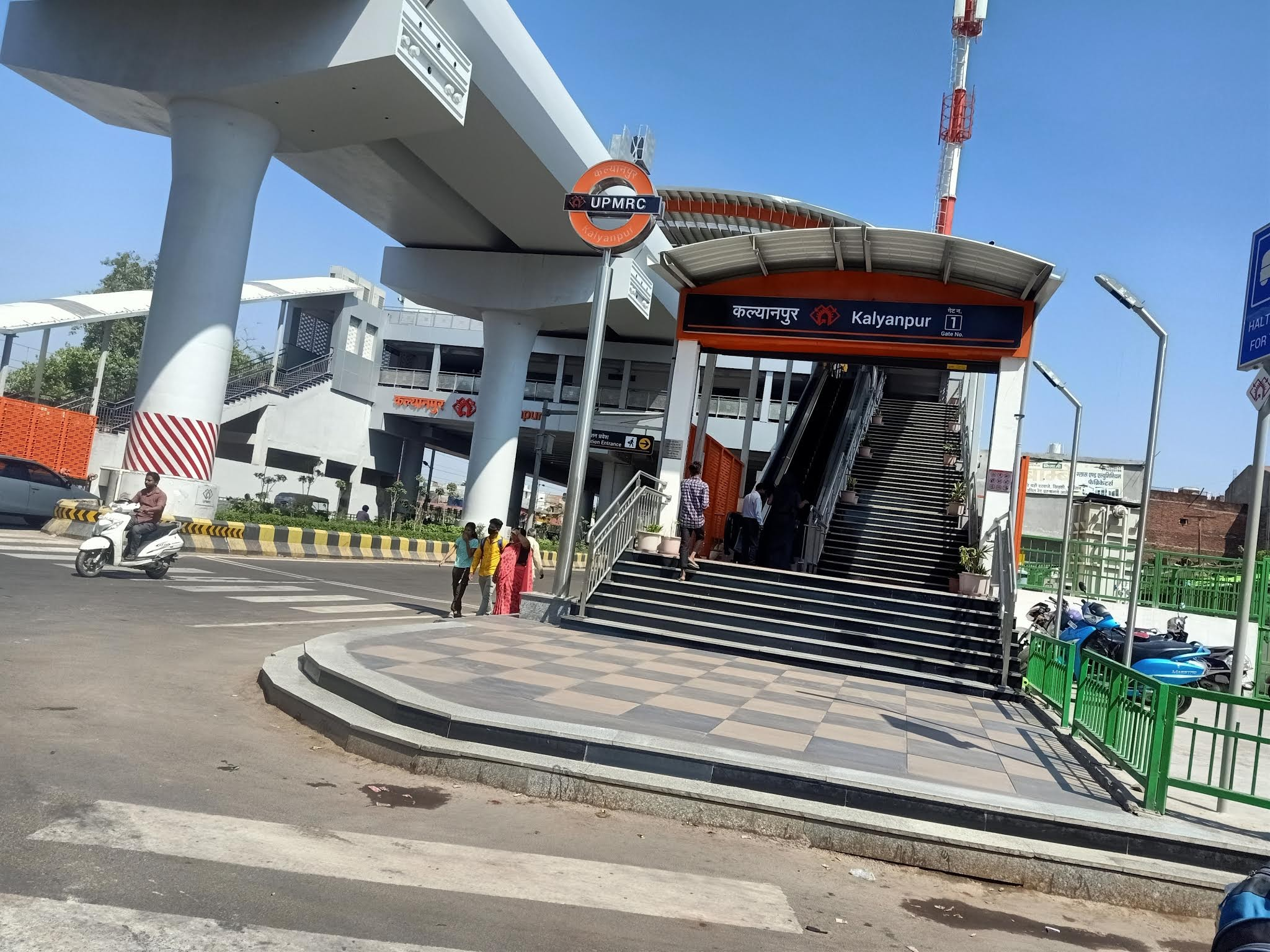

General information
- Location: NH 91, Gooba Gardens, Kalyanpur, Kanpur, Uttar Pradesh, 208017
- Coordinates: 26°30′12″N 80°15′10″E
- System: Kanpur Metro station
- Owner: Kanpur Metro
- Operator: Uttar Pradesh Metro Rail Corporation
- Line: Orange Line
- Platforms: Side platform Platform 1 → Kanpur Central; Platform 2 → IIT Kanpur
- Tracks: 2
- Connections: Kalianpur

Construction
- Structure type: Elevated, double track
- Platform levels: 2
- Parking: Three Wheeler - No; Four Wheeler - Yes

History
- Opened: 28 December 2021; 4 years ago
- Electrified: 750 V DC third rail

Services
Preceding station	Kanpur Metro	Following station
IIT Kanpur Terminus	Orange Line	SPM Hospital towards Kanpur Central
Route map
Location

Kalyanpur is a metro station on the east–west corridor of the Orange Line of Kanpur Metro in Kanpur, India. The station was opened on 28 December 2021 as part of the inaugural section of Kanpur Metro, between IIT Kanpur and Moti Jheel.

== Station layout ==
G	Street level	Exit/Entrance
L1	Mezzanine	Fare control, station agent, Metro Card vending machines, crossover
L2	Side platform | Doors will open on the left
L2	Platform 1 Eastbound	Towards → Kanpur Central; Next Station: SPM Hospital
L2	Platform 2 Westbound	Towards ← IIT Kanpur
L2	Side platform | Doors will open on the left
L2

== See also ==
- Kanpur
- Uttar Pradesh
- List of Kanpur Metro stations
- List of metro systems
- List of rapid transit systems in India
