= Rave@Moti Mall, Kanpur =

Shopping mall in Kanpur, India

Rave@Moti is a shopping mall in the Indian city of Kanpur. The mall is spread over an area of 2.50 Lac sq. ft and commercially operational since May 2001 The mall consists of three multiplexes by Adlabs, two restaurants, Tadka – Indian cuisine, Palate – Multicuisine, a banquet hall named Jalsaa, Food Court. The mall The major attractions are Big Bazaar, Cafe Coffee Day, Domino's Pizza, Timeout game zone and Baba Biryani, a restaurant chain opened by the famous biryani joint of the city.

== Location ==
The mall is situated in Rawatpur locality of the city and is situated just beside Rawatpur railway station. Due to proximity to educational institutions of Kanpur like HBTI, IITK, Kanpur University, Indian Institute of Pulses Research, GSVM Medical College and Polytechnic the mall is usually crowded with youngsters and students.

== Ownership ==
The mall is owned by Motilal Padampat Udyog and Rave Entertainment, a unit of Jagran Group beside other on lease.
