= Phanda Kala =

Phanda Kala Phanda Kalan, Fanda
- village
- Location within Madhya Pradesh Location within India
- Coordinates: 23.2280252°N 77.2088987°E
- Country: India
- State: Madhya Pradesh
- District: Bhopal
- Tehsil: Huzur
- Elevation: 520 m (1,710 ft)

Population (2011)
  - Total: 3,525
- Time zone: UTC+5:30 (IST)
- ISO 3166 code: MP-IN
- 2011 census code: 482476

Phanda Kala is a village in the Bhopal district of Madhya Pradesh, India. It is located in the Huzur tehsil and the Phanda block. In 2014, it was adopted by minister Najma Heptullah under the Sansad Adarsh Gram Yojana, a rural development programme.

A regional station of the Indian Institute of Pulses Research is located in Phanda. The Harihar Hindu temple is located in Phanda Kalan, and houses a 960-year old manuscript handwritten by saint Dipaji Sardar. The semi-annual Guruparva festival organised here attracts thousands of devotees.

== Demographics ==
According to the 2011 census of India, Phanda Kala has 666 households. The effective literacy rate (i.e. the literacy rate of population excluding children aged 6 and below) is 67.99%.

Demographics (2011 Census)
	Total	Male	Female
Population	3525	1827	1698
Children aged below 6 years	498	264	234
Scheduled caste	466	252	214
Scheduled tribe	64	24	40
Literates	2058	1238	820
Workers (all)	1257	928	329
Main workers (total)	857	765	92
Main workers: Cultivators	389	347	42
Main workers: Agricultural labourers	210	181	29
Main workers: Household industry workers	7	5	2
Main workers: Other	251	232	19
Marginal workers (total)	400	163	237
Marginal workers: Cultivators	56	32	24
Marginal workers: Agricultural labourers	230	100	130
Marginal workers: Household industry workers	6	3	3
Marginal workers: Others	108	28	80
Non-workers	2268	899	1369
