= Blue Line (Kanpur Metro) =

Mass transit system in Uttar Pradesh, India

Overview
- Status: Under Construction
- Locale: Kanpur, Uttar Pradesh, India
- Termini: Agriculture University; Barra-8
- Stations: 8

Service
- Type: Rapid transit
- System: Kanpur Metro
- Operator: Uttar Pradesh Metro Rail Corporation
- Rolling stock: Alstom - Bombardier Movia

Technical
- Line length: 8.6 km (5.3 mi)
- Character: Elevated & Underground
- Track gauge: 1,435 mm (4 ft 8 1/2 in) standard gauge
- Electrification: 750 V DC third rail
- Operating speed: 80 km/h (50 mph) (Top); 34 km/h (21 mph) (average)

The Blue Line (Line 2) (Hindi: ब्लू लाइन) of the Kanpur Metro is an under construction metro route of the mass rapid transit system in Kanpur. It consists of 8 stations from Agriculture University to Barra-8 with a total distance of 8.6 km. Construction of the line began in late 2023 and the corridor is currently under construction.

== List of stations ==
Blue Line
#	Station Name		Opening	Connections	Layout
#	English	Hindi	Opening	Connections	Layout
1	Agriculture University	कृषि विश्वविद्यालय	2027	None	Underground
2	Rawatpur	रावतपुर	2027	Rawatpur; Orange Line	Underground
3	Kakadeo	काकादेव	2027	None	Underground
4	Double Pulia	डबल पुलिया	2027	None	Underground
5	Vijay Nagar Chauraha	विजय नगर चौराहा	2027	None	Elevated
6	Shastri Chowk	शास्त्री चौक	2027	None	Elevated
7	Barra-7	बर्रा-7	2027	None	Elevated
8	Barra-8	बर्रा-8	2027	None	Elevated

== See also ==
- Kanpur
- Uttar Pradesh
- List of Kanpur Metro stations
- Orange Line (Kanpur Metro)
- Uttar Pradesh Metro Rail Corporation
- Uttar Pradesh State Road Transport Corporation
- List of rapid transit systems in India
- List of Metro Systems
