= Nayaganj metro station =

Kanpur Metro's Orange Line metro station

Nayaganj

General information
- System: Kanpur Metro station
- Owner: Kanpur Metro
- Operator: Uttar Pradesh Metro Rail Corporation
- Line: Orange Line
- Platforms: Side platform Platform 1 → Kanpur Central; Platform 2 → IIT Kanpur
- Tracks: 2

Construction
- Structure type: Underground, double track
- Platform levels: 2
- Parking: Three Wheeler - No; Four Wheeler - Yes

History
- Opened: 30 May 2025; 14 months ago
- Electrified: 750 V DC third rail

Services
Preceding station	Kanpur Metro	Following station
Bada Chauraha towards IIT Kanpur	Orange Line	Kanpur Central Terminus
Route map
Location

Nayaganj is a metro station on the East–West Corridor of the Orange Line of Kanpur Metro in Kanpur, India. The station was opened on 30 May 2025 as part of the Kanpur Metro, between IIT Kanpur and Kanpur Central.

== Station layout ==
G	Street level	Exit/Entrance
M	Mezzanine	Fare control, station agent, Ticket/token, shops
P	Platform 1 Eastbound	Towards → Kanpur Central**
P	Island platform | Doors will open on the right
P	Platform 2 Westbound	Towards ← IIT Kanpur; Next station: Bada Chauraha
**	Note	Further extension to Naubasta in the future
