= IIPR =

IIPR may refer to:

- Indian Institute of Pulses Research
- International Institute for Psychical Research
