= Vishwavidyalaya metro station =

Vishwavidyalaya metro station may refer to:

- Vishwavidyalaya metro station (Delhi)
- Vishwavidyalaya metro station (Kanpur)
- Vishwavidyalaya metro station (Lucknow)
