= Chunniganj metro station =

Kanpur Metro's Orange Line metro station

Chunniganj

General information
- System: Kanpur Metro station
- Owner: Kanpur Metro
- Operator: Uttar Pradesh Metro Rail Corporation
- Line: Orange Line
- Platforms: Side platform Platform 1 → Kanpur Central; Platform 2 → IIT Kanpur
- Tracks: 2

Construction
- Structure type: Underground, double track
- Platform levels: 2
- Parking: Three Wheeler - No; Four Wheeler - Yes

History
- Opened: 30 May 2025; 14 months ago
- Electrified: 750 V DC third rail

Services
| Preceding station | Kanpur Metro | Following station |
|---|---|---|
| Moti Jheel towards IIT Kanpur | Orange Line | Naveen Market towards Kanpur Central |
Route map
Location

Chunniganj metro station is a metro station on the East–West Corridor of the Orange Line of Kanpur Metro station in Kanpur, India. The station was opened on 30 May 2025 as part of the Kanpur Metro, between IIT Kanpur and Kanpur Central.

== Station layout ==
| G | Street level | Exit/Entrance |
| M | Mezzanine | Fare control, station agent, Ticket/token, shops |
| P | Platform 1 Eastbound | Towards → Kanpur Central**; Next station: Naveen Market |
| P | Island platform | Doors will open on the right |
| P | Platform 2 Westbound | Towards ← IIT Kanpur; Next station: Moti Jheel |
| ** | Note | Further extension to Naubasta in the future |
