= Rawatpur =

- suburb
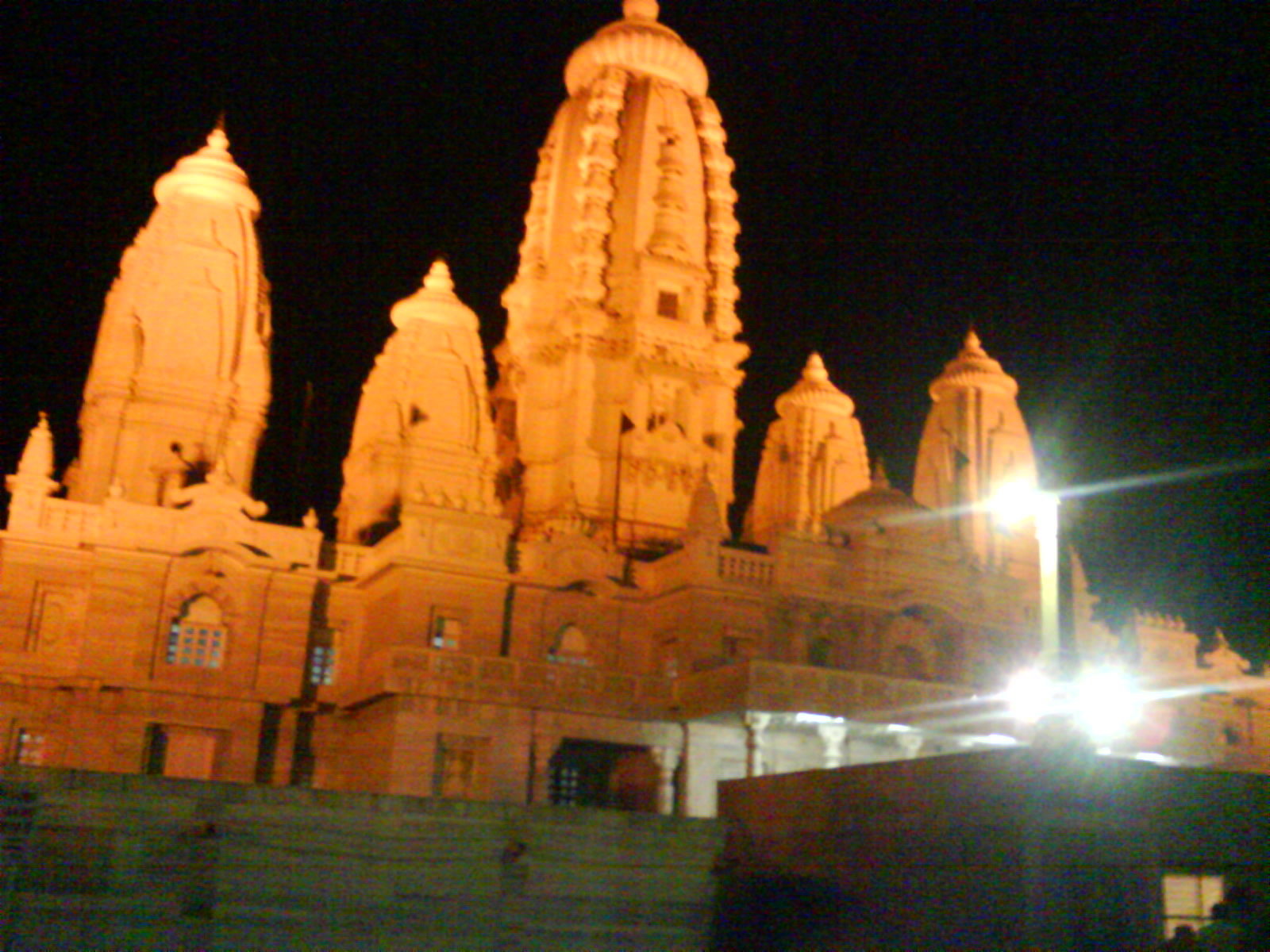
- The JK Temple in Rawatpur Downtown

- Location in Uttar Pradesh, India
- Coordinates: 26.50945°N 80.18468°E
- Country: India
- State: Uttar Pradesh
- District: Kanpur

Population (2011)
  - Total: 110,000
  - Density: 8,952/km^{2} (23,190/sq mi)

Languages
  - Official: Hindi, English, & Awadhi
- Time zone: UTC+5:30 (IST)
- PIN: 208 005; 208 025
- Vehicle registration: UP-78 & UP-77
- Nearest city: Kalyanpur
- Literacy: 84%
- Lok Sabha constituency: Akbarpur
- Vidhan Sabha constituency: Rawatpur(w), Rawatpur(e), Rawatpur – Rural

Rawatpur is a suburb in North Kanpur, India, situated about 10 km from Kanpur on the NH 91 to Delhi and 5 km from Kalyanpur, in the Kanpur metropolitan area. The population was 110,000 at the 2001 census, and it has 84% of literacy.

== Transport ==
Rawatpur has a bus station and UPSRTC Busses of Kanpur have routes from Rawatpur to different localities. Rawatpur has a railway station on the Kanpur-Mathura line. Kanpur Airport is the nearest airport.

== Tourist attractions ==
- J K Temple
- Rave@Moti Mall
- Gurudev Palace
- Indian Institute of Pulses Research
- Allen Forest Zoo
- Moti Jheel
- Geeta Nagar Stadium
- Ramlala Mandir Rawatpur Gaon

== See also ==
- Kalianpur
- Bithoor
