= CMRS =

CMRS may refer to:

- Capability-based Module Readiness System - see Expeditionary Air Wing
- Centre for Medieval and Renaissance Studies - Program for international students (mainly American) to study in Oxford.
- Certified Manager of Reporting Services - see National Court Reporters Association
- Classical, Mediaeval and Renaissance Studies - see University of Saskatchewan Academics
- Certified Medical Reimbursement Specialist
- Council-certified Microbial Remediation Supervisor, a professional certification
- Child Mania Rating Scale, a psychological screening tool for bipolar disorder
- Commercial Mobile Radio Service, a United States regulatory category of Mobile phone
- Critical Mixed Race Studies
