= Kalianpur railway station =

Railway station in Uttar Pradesh, India

General information
- Location: GT Road, Kalianpur, Kanpur, Uttar Pradesh; India
- Coordinates: 26.5033°N 80.2526°E
- Elevation: 132 metres (433 ft)
- System: Indian Railways station
- Owner: Indian Railways
- Operator: North Eastern Railway
- Platforms: 1
- Tracks: 2
- Connections: Orange Line Kalyanpur

Construction
- Structure type: At grade
- Parking: No
- Cycle facilities: No

Other information
- Status: Single electric line
- Station code: KAP
- Zone(s): North Eastern Railway
- Division(s): Lucknow NER
Location
- Location within India Location within Uttar Pradesh

Kalianpur railway station or Kalyanpur railway station is a small railway station in Kanpur district, Uttar Pradesh. Its code is KAP. It serves Kalyanpur city. The station consists of three platforms.

Formerly the metre-gauge line ran through Kalianpur and was connected to Brahmavarta station in Bithoor. But due to conversion of the metre-gauge railway line to broad-gauge line the railway route to Bithoor was subsequently closed and the Brahmavarta station now remains deserted. The Indian Railways have decided to extend line from Mandhana Central-Safipur Junction via Brahmavart. There were vital demands from the public to restart the railway route connecting Kanpur Central railway station to Brahmavarta, Bithoor though the matter remains reserved.
