= Orange Line (Kanpur Metro) =

Mass transit system in Uttar Pradesh, India

Overview
- Status: Operational
- Locale: Kanpur, Uttar Pradesh, India
- Termini: IIT Kanpur; Kanpur Central (further extended to Naubasta)
- Stations: 21; 14 (operational)

Service
- Type: Rapid transit
- System: Kanpur Metro
- Operator: Uttar Pradesh Metro Rail Corporation
- Rolling stock: Alstom - Bombardier Movia

History
- Opened: 28 December 2021

Technical
- Line length: 16 km (9.9 mi) (active); 7.78 km (4.83 mi) (under-construction)
- Character: Underground & elevated
- Track gauge: 1,435 mm (4 ft 8 1/2 in) standard gauge
- Electrification: 750 V DC third rail
- Operating speed: 80 km/h (50 mph) (Top); 34 km/h (21 mph) (average)

The Orange Line (Line 1) (Hindi: ऑरेंज लाइन) is a metro rail line of the Kanpur Metro, a rapid transit system in Kanpur, Uttar Pradesh, India. The priority section of the line was inaugurated on 28 December 2021, by the prime minister of India, Narendra Modi. In the first phase, a 9 km (5.6 mi) section of the route was opened, which is fully elevated. Another 5 underground stations were opened on 30 May 2025 by PM Modi, making the total 16 km operational. The total length of the route will be 23.8 km (14.8 mi) of which 15.2 km (9.4 mi) will be elevated, and 8.6 km (5.3 mi) will be underground. The line will have a total of 21 stations when the entire line is commissioned.

== List of stations ==
Orange Line
#	Station Name		Inter-station Distance (in km)	Opening	Connections	Layout	Coordinates
#	English	Hindi	Inter-station Distance (in km)	Opening	Connections	Layout	Coordinates
1	IIT Kanpur	आई आई टी कानपुर	0	28 December 2021	None	Elevated	26°30′33″N 80°14′54″E
2	Kalyanpur	कल्याणपुर	1.454	28 December 2021	Kalyanpur	Elevated	26°30′13″N 80°15′10″E
3	SPM Hospital	एस पी एम हॉस्पिटल	1.105	28 December 2021	None	Elevated	26°29′56″N 80°15′33″E
4	Vishwavidyalaya	विश्वविद्यालय	0.881	28 December 2021	None	Elevated	26°29′50″N 80°15′54″E
5	Gurudev Chauraha	गुरुदेव चौराहा	0.747	28 December 2021	None	Elevated	26°29′30″N 80°17′04″E
6	Geeta Nagar	गीता नगर	1.086	28 December 2021	None	Elevated	26°29′14″N 80°17′30″E
7	Rawatpur	रावतपुर	1.583	28 December 2021	Rawatpur Blue Line (Approved)	Elevated	26°28′59″N 80°18′00″E
8	LLR Hospital	एल एल आर हाॅस्पिटल	1.338	28 December 2021	None	Elevated	26°28′45″N 80°18′41″E
9	Moti Jheel	मोती झील	0.786	28 December 2021	None	Elevated	26°28′45″N 80°19′04″E
10	Chunniganj	चुन्नीगंज		30 May 2025	None	Underground	26°28′38″N 80°20′12″E
11	Naveen Market	नवीन मार्केट		30 May 2025	None	Underground	26°28′27″N 80°20′43″E
12	Bada Chauraha	बड़ा चौराहा		30 May 2025	None	Underground	26°28′22″N 80°21′09″E
13	Nayaganj	नयागंज		30 May 2025	None	Underground	26°27′52″N 80°21′34″E
14	Kanpur Central	कानपुर सेंट्रल		30 May 2025	Kanpur Central	Underground	26°27′13″N 80°21′04″E
15	Jhakarkati	झकरकटी		Under construction	Kanpur ISBT	Underground	
16	Transport Nagar	ट्रांसपोर्ट नगर		Under construction	None	Underground	
17	Bara Devi	बारा देवी		Under construction	None	Elevated	
18	Kidwai Nagar	किदवई नगर		Under construction	None	Elevated	
19	Vasant Vihar	वसंत विहार		Under construction	None	Elevated	
20	Baudh Nagar	बौद्ध नगर		Under construction	None	Elevated	
21	Naubasta	नौबस्ता		Under construction	None	Elevated	

== See also ==
- Kanpur
- Uttar Pradesh Metro Rail Corporation
- Uttar Pradesh State Road Transport Corporation
- List of rapid transit systems in India
- List of metro systems
