= Rawatpur railway station =

Railway station in India

Rawatpur

General information
- Location: GT Road, Rawatpur, Uttar Pradesh; India
- Coordinates: 26.4836°N 80.2976°E
- Elevation: 132 metres (433 ft)
- System: Indian Railways station
- Owner: Indian Railways
- Operator: North Eastern Railway
- Platforms: 1
- Tracks: 2
- Connections: Orange Line Rawatpur; Auto stand

Construction
- Structure type: Standard (on-ground station)
- Parking: No
- Cycle facilities: No

Other information
- Status: Active
- Station code: RPO
- Zone(s): North Eastern Railway
- Division(s): Izzatnagar
Location
- Location within India Location within Uttar Pradesh

Rawatpur railway station is a small railway station in Kanpur district, Uttar Pradesh. Its code is RPO. It serves Rawatpur city. The station consists of one platform. The platform is not well sheltered. It lacks many facilities including water and sanitation. There has been proposal to halt Express trains at Rawatpur.
