= Indian Institute of Pulses Research =

Indian research institute focused on legumes

Coordinates: 20.27°N 80.14°E

- Type: Government
- Established: 1983; 43 years ago
- Affiliations: ICAR
- Location: Kanpur, Uttar Pradesh, India
- Nickname: IIPR
- Website: iipr.icar.gov.in

Indian Institute of Pulses Research (IIPR, Hindi: भारतीय दलहन अनुसन्धान संस्थान) is a government institute in Kanpur, Uttar Pradesh It was established in the year 1983 by the Indian Council of Agricultural Research (ICAR) to carry out basic strategic and applied research on major pulse crops. It is situated on Grand Trunk Road and is about twelve kilometer from Kanpur Central Railway Station towards New Delhi.

The institute originated from the All India Coordinated Pulses Improvement Project (AICPIP) at Indian Agricultural Research Institute (IARI), New Delhi in 1966. Later in 1978, its headquarters was shifted to the then Regional Station of IARI at Kanpur under the name of Project Directorate (Pulses). It was further elevated as Directorate of Pulses Research (DPR) in 1984 and became an independent entity under the direct control of ICAR.

The Institute develops appropriate production and protection technologies, production and supply of breeder seeds of improved varieties, demonstration and transfer of technologies and strategic coordination of pulse research through the network of testing centers across the country.
