= Moti Jheel metro station =

Kanpur Metro's Orange Line metro station

Moti Jheel
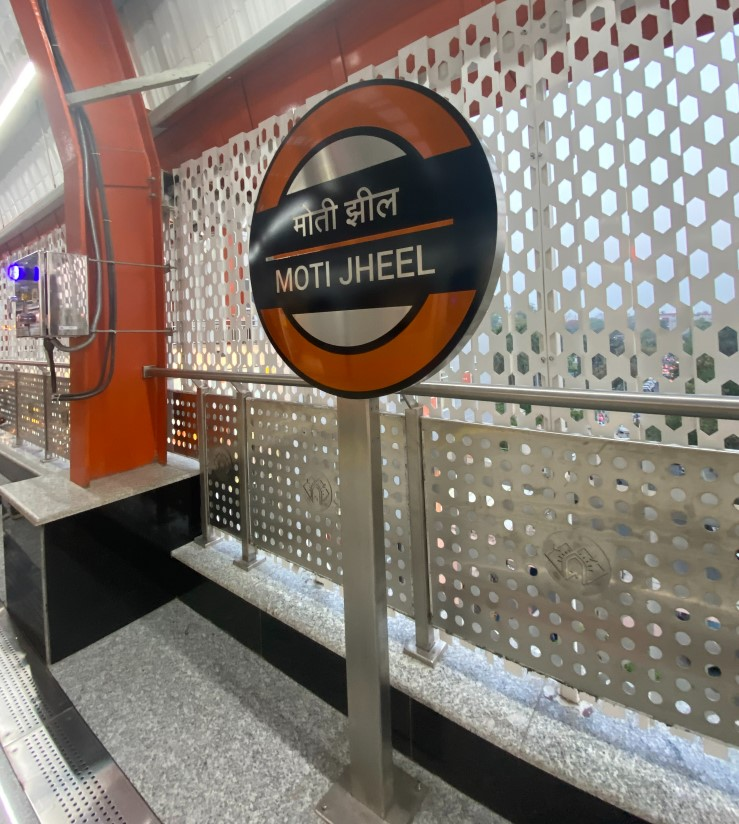

General information
- Location: Motilal Swaroop Nagar, Harsh Nagar, Kanpur, Uttar Pradesh, 208001
- Coordinates: 26°28′45″N 80°19′02″E
- System: Kanpur Metro station
- Owner: Kanpur Metro
- Operator: Uttar Pradesh Metro Rail Corporation
- Line: Orange Line
- Platforms: Side platform Platform 1 →Kanpur Central; Platform 2 → IIT Kanpur
- Tracks: 2

Construction
- Structure type: Elevated, double track
- Platform levels: 2
- Parking: Two & Four Wheeler - Yes

History
- Opened: 28 December 2021; 4 years ago
- Electrified: 750 V DC third rail

Services
Preceding station	Kanpur Metro	Following station
LLR Hospital towards IIT Kanpur	Orange Line	Chunniganj towards Kanpur Central
Route map
Location

Moti Jheel is a metro station on the East-West corridor of the Orange Line of Kanpur Metro in Kanpur, India. The station was opened on 28 December 2021 as part of the inaugural section of Kanpur Metro, between IIT Kanpur and Moti Jheel.

== Station layout ==
G	Street level	Exit/Entrance
L1	Mezzanine	Fare control, station agent, Metro Card vending machines, crossover
L2	Side platform | Doors will open on the left
L2	Platform 1 Eastbound	Towards → Kanpur Central**; Next Station: Chunniganj
L2	Platform 2 Westbound	Towards ← IIT Kanpur; Next Station: LLR Hospital
L2	Side platform | Doors will open on the left
**	Note	Further extension to Naubasta in the future

== See also ==
- Kanpur
- Uttar Pradesh
- List of Kanpur Metro stations
- List of metro systems
- List of rapid transit systems in India
