= Kanpur Metro =

Metro service in Kanpur, India

- UPMRC Logo

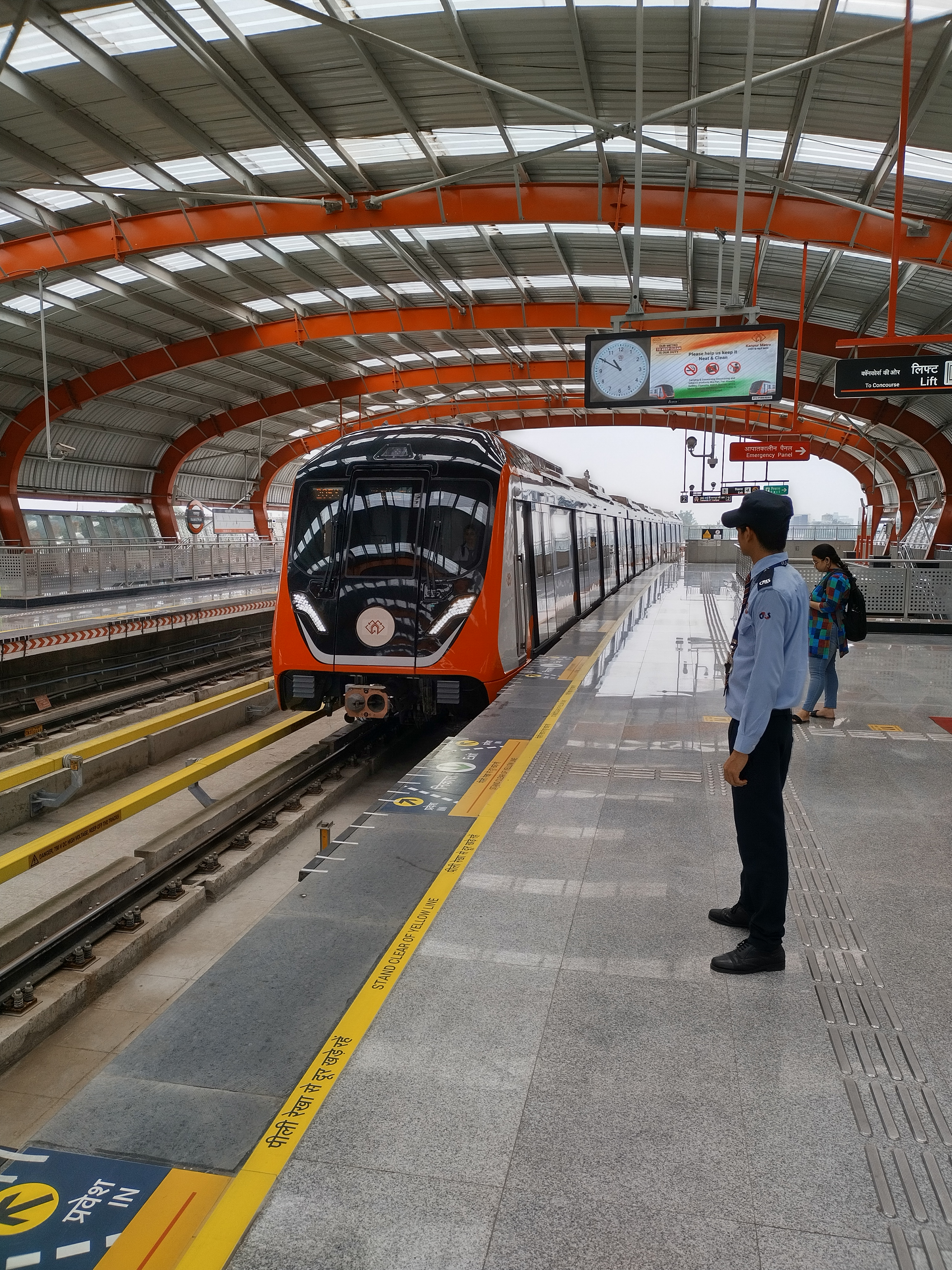
- Kanpur Metro Train at a station

Overview
- Owner: Uttar Pradesh Metro Rail Corporation
- Area served: Kanpur Metropolitan Area
- Locale: Kanpur, Uttar Pradesh, India
- Transit type: Rapid transit
- Number of lines: 2
- Line number: Orange Line (West-South Line); Blue Line (North-South Line) (under-construction)
- Number of stations: 14 (Operational); 15 (Under-Construction)
- Daily ridership: 35,000 per day
- Headquarters: Kanpur Metro Depot, Gurudev Chauraha, Kanpur, Uttar Pradesh, 208024, India
- Website: Kanpur Metro

Operation
- Began operation: 28 December 2021; 4 years ago
- Operator: UPMRC
- Character: Elevated & Underground
- Train length: 3 coaches
- Headway: 3 minutes

Technical
- System length: Orange Line 16 km (9.9 mi) (operational) 7.78 km (4.83 mi) (Under Construction) Blue Line 8.6 km (5.3 mi) (Under construction)
- Track gauge: 1,435 mm (4 ft 8 1/2 in) standard gauge
- Electrification: 750 V DC third rail
- Average speed: 40 km/h (25 mph)
- Top speed: 80 km/h (50 mph)
Route map
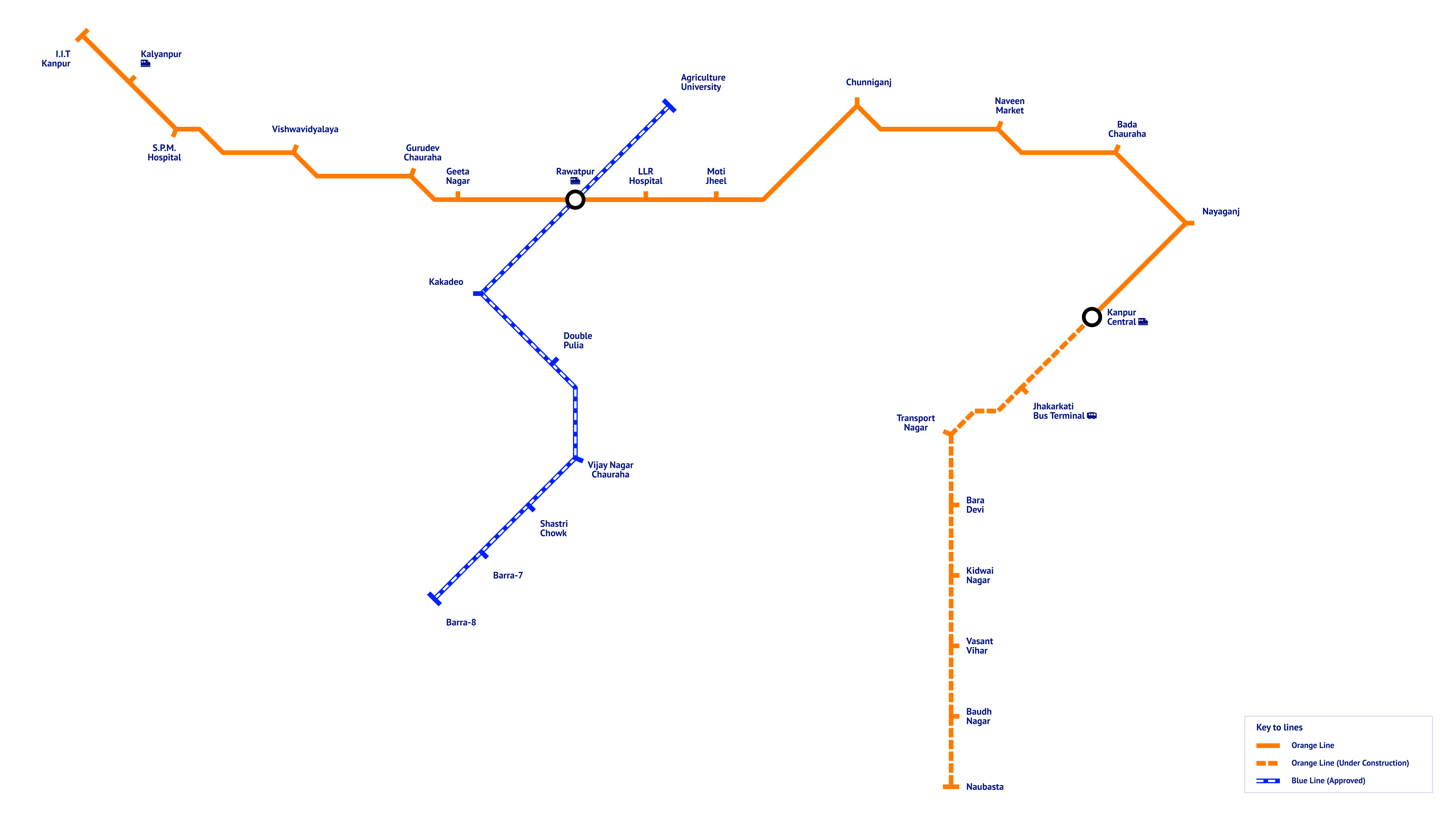

The Kanpur Metro is a mass rapid transit (MRT) system in Kanpur, Uttar Pradesh, India. The metro is owned and operated by the Uttar Pradesh Metro Rail Corporation (UPMRC) and it partially opened within two years of construction making it the fastest constructed mass rapid transit system in the world. The cost of construction is estimated at ₹11,076.48 crores for two lines in Phase I. Kanpur Metro will be expanded farther to Kanpur Airport and other important areas of Kanpur in the future.

== History ==
The feasibility study for the project was done by RITES in June 2015. The government approved two corridors as per the Detailed Project Report (DPR). The tenders were floated for the priority section of corridor-1 between IIT Kanpur to Motijheel. The company Afcons Infrastructure was awarded the tender.

On 28 February 2019, the Central Government approved the metro project for Kanpur at an estimated cost of ₹ 11,076.48 crores and a five-year time limit. Construction work began on 15 November 2019, with the first section opening in December 2021 from IIT Kanpur to Motijheel which was inaugurated by Prime Minister Narendra Modi on 28 December 2021.

5 more underground stations from Chunniganj to Kanpur Central were inaugurated by Prime Minister Narendra Modi on 30 May 2025.

There is an ongoing proposal to extend Line 1 from Naubasta and Line 2 from Barra-8, with the aim of linking the two metro corridor.

On 29th of June 2026, CMRS conducted final trial of the remaining section of the Line 1 and check the public amenities of remaining stations between Kanpur Central and Naubasta and submitted final report.

== Construction Phases ==
=== Phase 1 ===
Phase 1 comprises the Orange Line (Corridor 1), connecting IIT Kanpur with Naubasta, and the Blue Line (Corridor 2), connecting Agriculture University with Barra-8.

==== Orange Line ====
Construction of the Orange Line, connecting IIT Kanpur with Naubasta, began on 15 November 2019 with the approximately nine-kilometre priority section between IIT Kanpur and Motijheel, comprising nine elevated stations. The priority section was inaugurated on 28 December 2021. Construction of the Chunniganj–Nayaganj underground section commenced on 11 October 2021 with diaphragm-wall work at Naveen Market station and the casting of precast structures at the HBTU casting yard. Tunnel boring machines named Nana and Tatya were subsequently deployed to construct the tunnels in this section. Work also progressed on the Kanpur Central–Transport Nagar underground section, where the first diaphragm-wall panel at Jhakarkati station was lowered on 10 June 2022. Civil construction of the Baradevi–Naubasta elevated section began on 8 August 2022, followed by the erection of its first pier cap on 27 December 2022 and its first U-girder near Kidwai Nagar on 21 January 2023. On 30 May 2025, the extension to Kanpur Central was inaugurated, adding five underground stations at Chunniganj, Naveen Market, Bada Chauraha, Nayaganj and Kanpur Central and bringing the operational corridor to approximately 16 kilometres with 14 stations.

==== Blue Line ====
Construction of the Blue Line, connecting Agriculture University with Barra-8, was divided into underground and elevated packages. The underground package, KNPCC-11, was awarded to the Kalpataru Projects International–Gülermak joint venture in December 2023 and includes twin tunnels, cut-and-cover works, depot connection ramps and three underground stations at Rawatpur, Kakadeo and Double Pulia. By early April 2024, diaphragm-wall excavation had begun at Rawatpur following soil testing, barricading and utility relocation. The underground stations were designed to use the top-down construction method, allowing excavation beneath completed roof slabs and the progressive restoration of road space above. Rawatpur was designated as the interchange between the two corridors. The elevated package, KNPCC-12, was awarded to Ceigall India in March 2024 for approximately ₹427.11 crore and covers two separate elevated stretches with five stations at Agriculture University, Vijay Nagar Chauraha, Shastri Chowk, Barra-7 and Barra-8. By early July 2024, the contractor had completed drilling and concreting the package's first pile. The tunnel boring machine Gomti was commissioned at Rawatpur in October 2024 and achieved its first breakthrough on 23 January 2025 after excavating approximately 622 metres towards Agriculture University. Rail welding and track laying on the elevated section began near Vijay Nagar station on 2 June 2026, while track construction was already underway in the underground section. On 13 October 2026, a train completed the corridor's first test run along the down-line from the Corridor 2 depot through Rawatpur, Kakadeo and Double Pulia underground stations to the ramp near Vijay Nagar Chauraha.

Phase 1 network
No.	Line	Stations	Length (km)	Terminals		Status	Opening date
1	Orange Line	9	9.3	IIT Kanpur	Moti Jheel	Completed	28 December 2021
1	Orange Line	5	6	Moti Jheel	Kanpur Central	Completed	30 May 2025
1	Orange Line	7	8.5	Kanpur Central	Naubasta	Under Construction	
2	Blue Line	8	8.6	Agriculture University	Barra-8	Under Construction	
Total		29	32.4				

=== Proposed network ===
In June 2026, the Uttar Pradesh Metro Rail Corporation (UPMRC) proposed the expansion of the Kanpur Metro network through seven additional corridors with a combined length of 83.658 km under the city's Comprehensive Mobility Plan (CMP). The Government of Uttar Pradesh approved the Detailed Project Report (DPR) for the Naubasta–Barra-8 corridor, while six other corridors were identified for future expansion.

Corridor	From	To	Length	Construction	Status
Naubasta–Barra-8 Corridor	Naubasta	Barra-8	8.078 km	Elevated	DPR Approved by State Government
Unnao–Namak Factory Corridor	Unnao	Namak Factory (via Gumti No. 5)	35.81 km	Elevated / Underground	Proposed
Naubasta–Chakeri Corridor	Naubasta	Chakeri (Kanpur Airport)	14.6 km	Underground	Proposed
CSA University–Khyora Katari Corridor	CSA University	Khyora Katari	4.39 km	Elevated	Proposed
Namak Factory–Panki Extension Corridor	Namak Factory	Panki Extension	6 km	Elevated	Proposed
Khyora Katari–Trans Ganga City Branch Line	Khyora Katari	Trans Ganga City	9 km	Elevated	Proposed
Naubasta–Ramaipur Corridor	Naubasta	Ramaipur	5.45 km	Elevated	Proposed

== Lines ==
=== Orange Line ===
The Orange Line is planned to connect IIT Kanpur with Naubasta. The full corridor is approximately 23.8 kilometres (14.8 mi) long and comprises 21 planned stations, including 14 elevated and seven underground stations.

The line opened in stages. Its initial 9-kilometre (5.6 mi) section between IIT Kanpur and Motijheel, comprising nine elevated stations, was inaugurated on 28 December 2021. Services were extended to Kanpur Central on 30 May 2025. The extension added five underground stations—Chunniganj, Naveen Market, Bada Chauraha, Nayaganj and Kanpur Central—bringing the number of operational stations to 14.

=== Blue Line ===
The Blue Line is planned to connect Agriculture University with Barra-8. The approximately 8.6-kilometre (5.3 mi) corridor is planned to comprise eight stations, including five elevated and three underground stations. The underground stations are Rawatpur, Kakadeo and Double Pulia.

In October 2026, a metro train completed a test run from the Corridor 2 depot through the three underground stations to the ramp near Vijay Nagar Chauraha. Construction and testing were continuing ahead of the commencement of passenger services.

== Network ==
Kanpur Metro
No.	Line Name	Terminal		Stations	Length	First Operational	Last Extension
1	Orange Line	IIT Kanpur	Kanpur Central	14	15.3 km (9.5 mi)	28 December 2021	30 May 2025
Total				14	15.3 km (9.5 mi)		

== Operations ==
The trains operate at a frequency of five minutes between 6 am and 10:30 pm. The trains operate with ATO over CBTC, with a design speed of 90 km/h and an operational speed of 80 km/h. Automated station announcements are recorded in Hindi and English. Many stations have services such as ATMs, food outlets, cafés, convenience stores and mobile recharge. Eating, drinking, smoking and chewing gum are prohibited in the entire system.

== Ticketing and recharge ==
=== Fare collection ===
Slab	No. of stations travelled	Metro Fare (₹)
1	1	10
2	2	15
3	3 - 6	20
4	7 - 9	30
5	10 - 13	40
6	14 - 17	50
7	18 and more	60

== Kanpur Metro GoSmart Card ==
State Bank of India and Uttar Pradesh Metro Rail Corporation (UPMRC) has introduced Kanpur Metro GoSmart Card to metro passengers. This card is available in all metro stations.

Through this Metro card, passengers can travel without the hassle of being in the ticket queue. This EVM based card can be recharged in a range of Rs.100 to Rs.2000 and in multiples of 100.

Metro passengers can get 10% off on all their rides if transactions are made through this card.

== Awards ==
● Kanpur Metro was awarded with India's best design award.

● Kanpur Metro is the fastest constructed metro system in the world.

● Kanpur Metro receives an award for environment protection from Delhi's Greentech Foundation.

● Kanpur Metro's priority corridor gets 'Effective Safety Culture.

● UPMRC's Kanpur Metro receives a platinum rating by IGBC.

== Rolling stock ==
IIT Kanpur metro station

In July 2020, Bombardier Transportation (acquired by Alstom) won the Agra Metro and Kanpur Metro rolling stock, and the signalling contract and manufacturing started on 26 Feb 2021. UPMRC's Managing Director Shri Kumar Keshav inaugurated the Rolling Stocks (Metro Trains) manufacturing in Bombardier's Savli Plant in Gujarat, located near Vadodara.

Kanpur to get total 39 trains of 3 Metro coaches (which would total up to 117 compartments) each for both the corridors of the Kanpur Metro Project, including Corridor-I i.e. From IIT to Naubasta and Corridor-II i.e. From Agriculture University to Barra-8. These trains have been designed with assistance from Bombardier Germany and design experts at Bombardier's Hyderabad office.

The trains are in line with utmost passenger safety and energy conservation, and each train is equipped with Communication Based Train Control System (CBTC) for Automatic Train Operations. These trains will also be equipped with CO_{2} sensor-based air-conditioning system to save energy during operations.

Valued at approximately ₹2051 crore (245 Mn EUR), Alstom's scope on the Agra-Kanpur metro project includes – the design, build and delivery of total 201 metro cars (67 MOVIA metro three-car trainsets) and an advanced signalling solution (CITYFLO 650).

== Important places nearby Metro stations ==
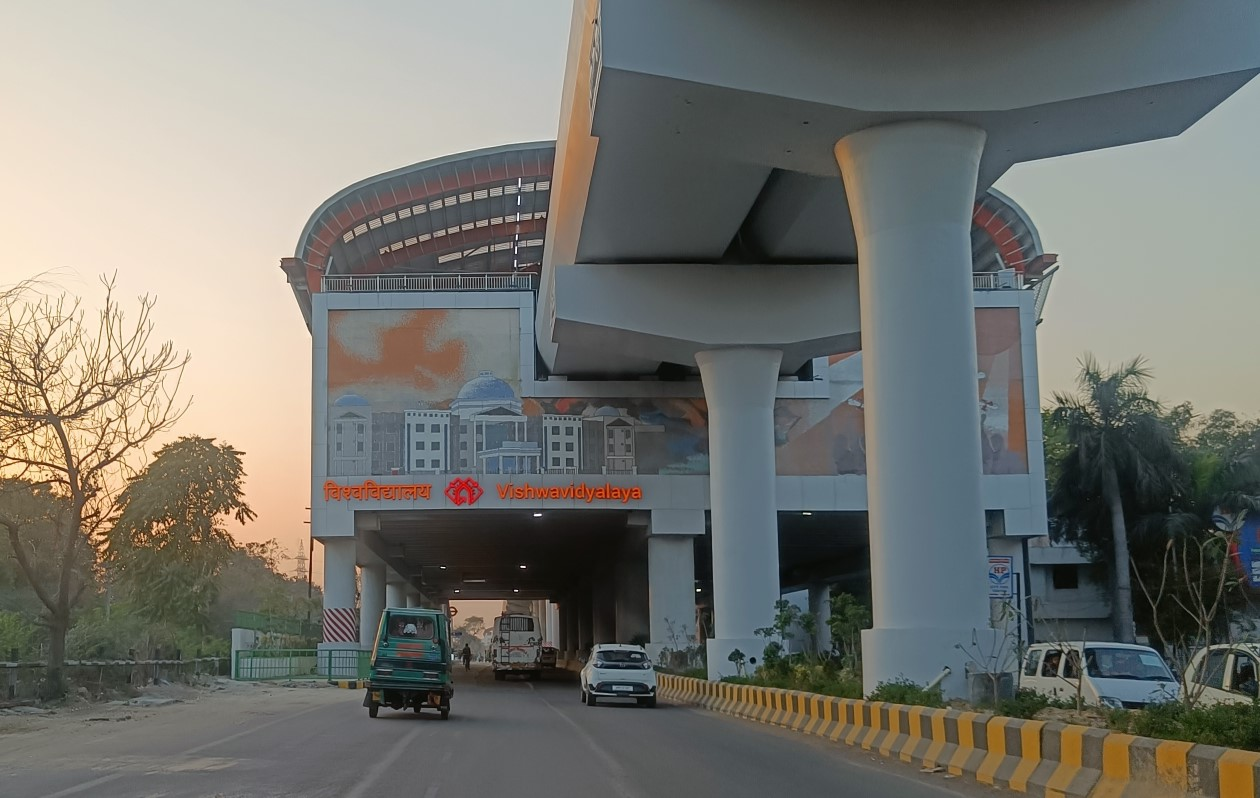
Vishwavidyalaya metro station

- IIT Kanpur
- Anandeshwar Temple, Parmat
- Kanpur Central
- Z Square Mall
- Naveen Market
- Parade Market
- PPN College Kanpur
- Christ Church College Kanpur
- Phoolbagh
- Company Bagh
- Birhana Road Market
- Kanpur Convention Centre
- Rave 3 Mall
- Kanpur Zoo
- Luv Kush Barrage & Boat Club
- Kanpur Metro Depot
- Miraj Cinemas (Gurudev Pammi)
- Kakadeo Market
- Rave Moti Mall
- J.K. Temple
- GSVM College
- Hallet Hospital (LLR)
- Motijheel
- Swaroop Nagar Market

== Timeline ==
The Kanpur Metro project was proposed in 2015, and after state and central approvals, construction began in 2017.

The priority corridor from IIT Kanpur to Motijheel was completed in 2021, with commercial operations inaugurated by PM Modi on 28 December 2021.

5 more underground stations from Chunniganj to Kanpur Central was inaugurated by Prime Minister Narendra Modi on 30 May 2025.

Major construction work on Line-2 has been completed with only signalling/third rail installation work underway and CMRS team conducted extensive trial from 27-29 June of 2026 on the remaining section of line 1 from Kanpur Central to Naubasta. The entire stretch of line 1 from IIT to Naubasta is expected to be inaugurated shortly by Prime Minister Narendra Modi

== See also ==
- Urban rail transit in India
  - Uttar Pradesh Metro Rail Corporation
    - Lucknow Metro
    - Agra Metro
  - Meerut Metro
  - Delhi Meerut RRTS
- Uttar Pradesh State Road Transport Corporation
