= Kanpur Central metro station =

Kanpur Metro's Orange Line terminal metro station

Kanpur Central

General information
- System: Kanpur Metro station
- Owner: Kanpur Metro
- Operator: Uttar Pradesh Metro Rail Corporation
- Line: Orange Line
- Platforms: Side platform Platform 1 → Terminus; Platform 2 → IIT Kanpur
- Tracks: 2
- Connections: Kanpur Central

Construction
- Structure type: Underground, double track
- Platform levels: 2
- Parking: Three Wheeler - No; Four Wheeler - Yes

History
- Opened: 30 May 2025; 14 months ago
- Electrified: 750 V DC third rail

Services
Preceding station	Kanpur Metro	Following station
Nayaganj towards IIT Kanpur	Orange Line	Terminus
Future Service
Nayaganj towards IIT Kanpur	Orange Line (To be extended)	Jhakarkati Bus Terminal towards Naubasta
Route map
Location

Kanpur Central is an underground terminal metro station on the east–west corridor of the Orange Line of Kanpur Metro station in Kanpur, India. The station was opened on 30 May 2025 as part of the Orange Line extension between Chunniganj and Kanpur Central. It connects the Kanpur Central railway station with the metro network.

== Station layout ==
G	Street level	Exit/Entrance
M	Mezzanine	Fare control, station agent, Ticket/token, shops
P	Platform 1 Eastbound	Train terminates here**
P	Island platform | Doors will open on the right
P	Platform 2 Westbound	Towards ← IIT Kanpur; Next station: Nayaganj
**	Note	Further extension to Naubasta in the future
