= Shahpur metro station =

Ahmedabad Metro's Blue Line metro station

Shahpur
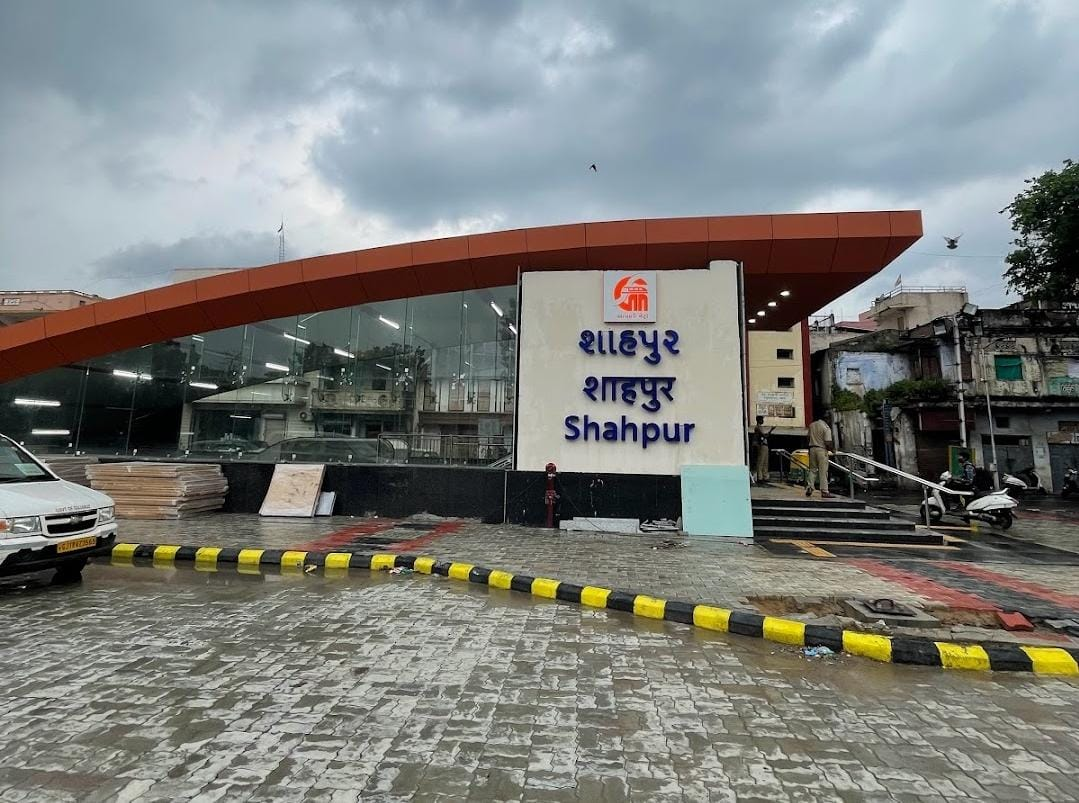

General information
- Location: Old City, Halim Ni Khadki, Shahpur, Ahmedabad, Gujarat 380004
- Coordinates: 23°02′21″N 72°34′52″E
- System: Ahmedabad Metro station
- Owner: Gujarat Metro Rail Corporation Limited
- Operator: Ahmedabad Metro
- Line: Blue Line
- Platforms: 2 (1 island platforms)
- Tracks: 2

Construction
- Structure type: Underground, Double track
- Accessible: Yes

Other information
- Status: Operational

History
- Opening: 30 September 2022; 3 years ago

Services
Preceding station	Ahmedabad Metro	Following station
Old High Court towards Thaltej Gam	Blue Line	Gheekanta towards Vastral Gam
Route map
Location

Shahpur is an underground metro station on the East-West Corridor of the Blue Line of Ahmedabad Metro in Ahmedabad, India. This metro station consists of the main Ahmedabad Urban Healthcare Centre along with Madhupur Police station.

Phase 1 of the metro was opened to the public on 30 September 2022.

== Station layout ==
G	Street level	Exit/ Entrance
M	Mezzanine	Fare control, station agent, Ticket/token, shops
P	Platform 1 Eastbound	Towards → Vastral Gam; Next Station: Gheekanta
P	Island platform | Doors will open on the right
P	Platform 2 Westbound	Towards ← Thaltej; Next Station: Old High Court Change at the next station for Red Line

== See also ==
- Ahmedabad
- Gujarat
- List of Ahmedabad Metro stations
- Rapid transit in India
