= Commerce Six Road metro station =

Ahmedabad Metro's Blue Line metro station

Commerce Six Road
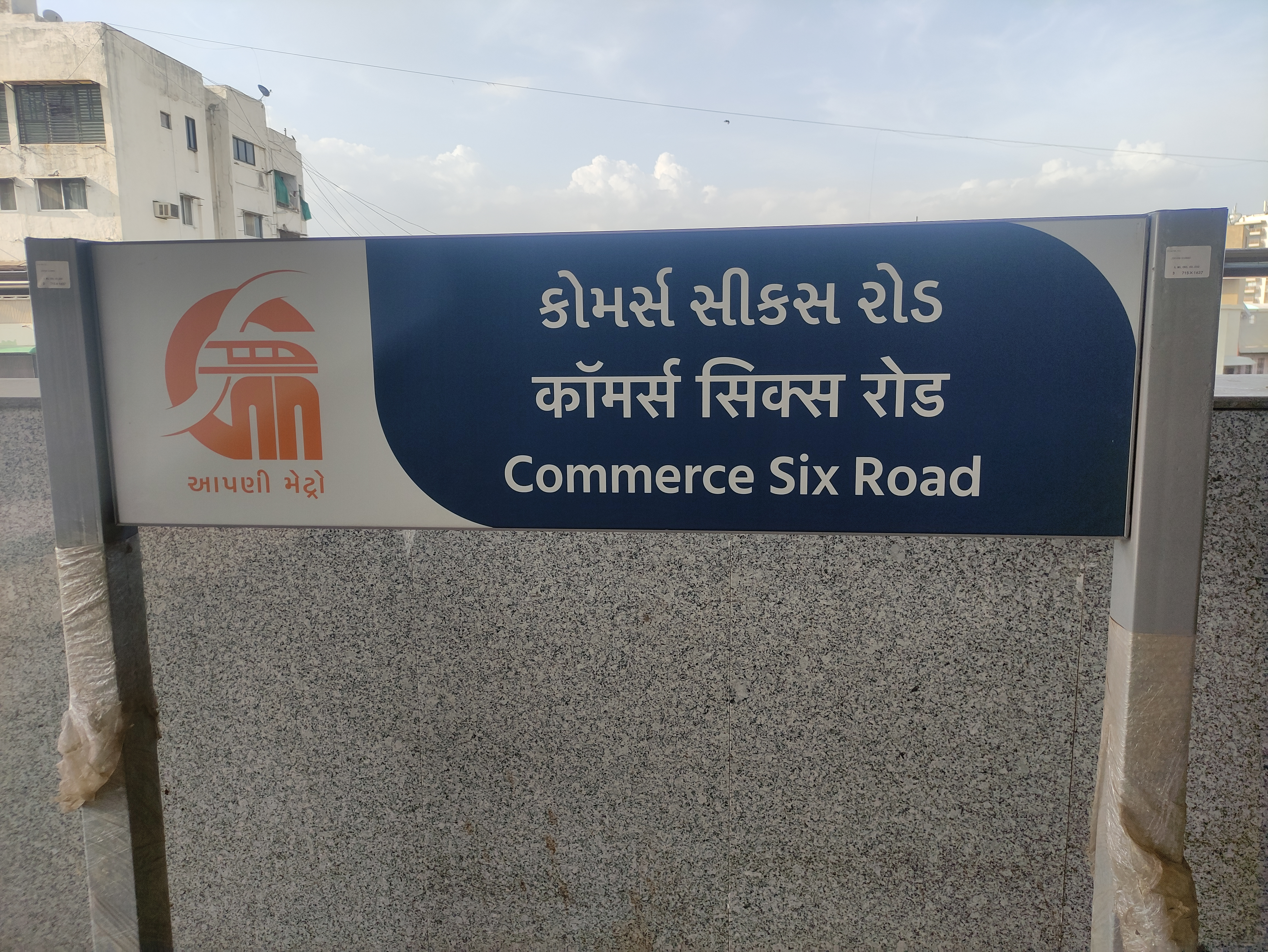

General information
- Location: Sarvottam Nagar Society, Navrangpura, Ahmedabad, Gujarat 380009
- Coordinates: 23°02′27″N 72°33′11″E
- System: Ahmedabad Metro station
- Owner: Gujarat Metro Rail Corporation Limited
- Operator: Ahmedabad Metro
- Line: Blue Line
- Platforms: 2 (2 side platforms)
- Tracks: 2

Construction
- Structure type: Elevated, Double track
- Accessible: Yes

Other information
- Status: Operational

History
- Opening: 30 September 2022; 3 years ago

Services
Preceding station	Ahmedabad Metro	Following station
Gujarat University towards Thaltej Gam	Blue Line	SP Stadium towards Vastral Gam
Route map
Location

Commerce Six Road is an elevated metro station on the East-West Corridor of the Blue Line of Ahmedabad Metro in Ahmedabad, India. This metro station consists of the main Navarangpura Fire Station along with Passport Seva Kendra and M.G. Science Institute in Ahmedabad. This metro station was opened to the public on 30 September 2022.

== Station layout ==
G	Street level	Exit/Entrance
L1	Mezzanine	Fare control, station agent, Metro Card vending machines, crossover
L2	Side platform | Doors will open on the left
L2	Platform 1 Eastbound	Towards → Vastram Gam; Next Station: SP Stadium
L2	Platform 2 Westbound	Towards ← Thaltej; Next Station: Gujarat University
L2	Side platform | Doors will open on the left
L2

== See also ==
- List of Ahmedabad Metro stations
- Rapid transit in India
