= Gujarat University metro station =

Ahmedabad Metro's Blue Line metro station

Gujarat University
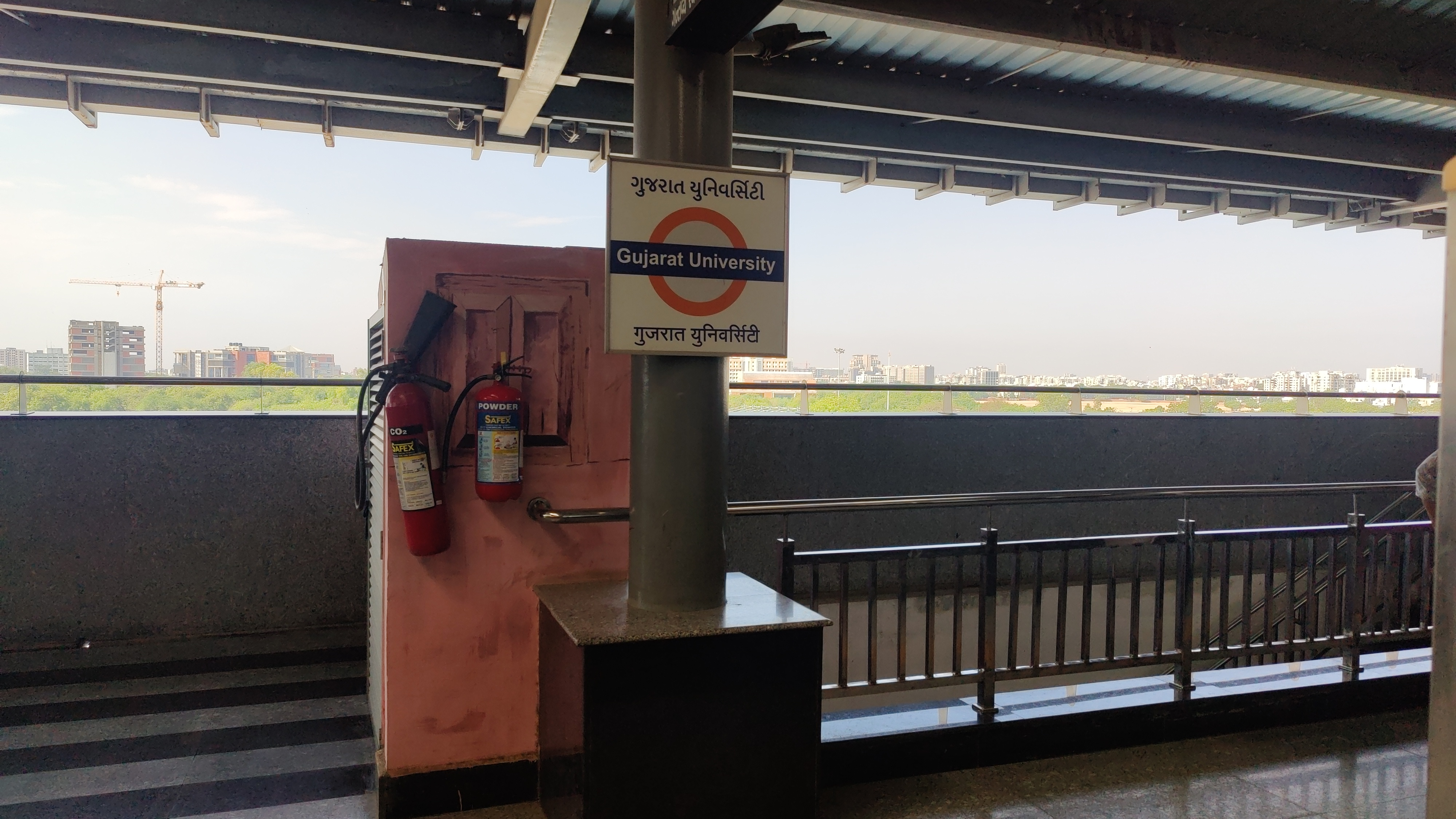

General information
- Location: Naranpura, Ahmedabad, Gujarat 380009
- Coordinates: 23°02′41″N 72°32′37″E
- System: Ahmedabad Metro station
- Owner: Gujarat Metro Rail Corporation Limited
- Operator: Ahmedabad Metro
- Line: Blue Line
- Platforms: 2 (2 side platforms)
- Tracks: 2

Construction
- Structure type: Elevated, Double track
- Accessible: Yes

Other information
- Status: Operational

History
- Opening: 30 September 2022; 3 years ago

Services
Preceding station	Ahmedabad Metro	Following station
Gurukul Road towards Thaltej Gam	Blue Line	Commerce Six Road towards Vastral Gam
Route map
Location

Gujarat University is an elevated metro station on the East-West Corridor of the Blue Line of Ahmedabad Metro in Ahmedabad, India, which holds the main Gujarat University's Convention and Exhibition Center. It was opened to the public on 30 September 2022.

== Station layout ==
G	Street level	Exit/Entrance
L1	Mezzanine	Fare control, station agent, Metro Card vending machines, crossover
L2	Side platform | Doors will open on the left
L2	Platform 1 Eastbound	Towards → Vastram Gam; Next Station: Commerce Six Road
L2	Platform 2 Westbound	Towards ← Thaltej; Next Station: Gurukul Road
L2	Side platform | Doors will open on the left
L2

== See also ==
- Ahmedabad
- Gujarat
- List of Ahmedabad Metro stations
- Rapid transit in India
