= Rabari Colony metro station =

Ahmedabad Metro's Blue Line metro station

Rabari Colony
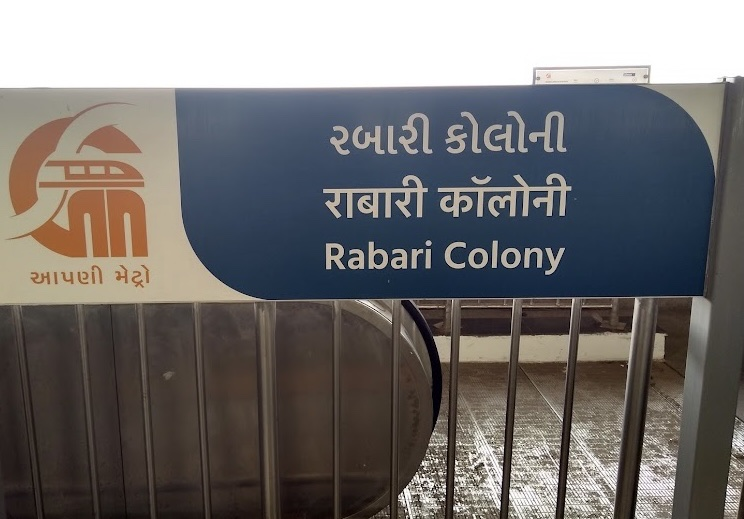

General information
- Location: Rabari Colony, Amraiwadi, Ahmedabad, Gujarat 380026
- Coordinates: 23.00553°N 72.63545°E
- System: Ahmedabad Metro station
- Owner: Gujarat Metro Rail Corporation Limited
- Operator: Ahmedabad Metro
- Line: Blue Line
- Platforms: Side platform Platform-1 → Vastral Gam; Platform-2 → Thaltej
- Tracks: 2

Construction
- Structure type: Elevated, Double track
- Platform levels: 2
- Accessible: Yes

Other information
- Status: Operational

History
- Opening: 4 March 2019; 7 years ago
- Electrified: 750 V DC third rail

Services
Preceding station	Ahmedabad Metro	Following station
Amraiwadi towards Thaltej	Blue Line	Vastral towards Vastral Gam
Route map
Location

Rabari Colony is an elevated metro station on the East-West Corridor of the Blue Line of Ahmedabad Metro in Ahmedabad, India. This metro station consists of the main Rabari Colony BRTS and the Vivekanand Vidhyalaya School in Sathyam Nagar (Ahmedabad). This metro station was opened to the public on 4 March 2019.

== Station layout ==
G	Street level	Exit/Entrance
L1	Mezzanine	Fare control, station agent, Metro Card vending machines, crossover
L2	Side platform | Doors will open on the left
L2	Platform 1 Eastbound	Towards → Vastram Gam; Next Station: Vastral
L2	Platform 2 Westbound	Towards ← Thaltej; Next Station: Amraiwadi
L2	Side platform | Doors will open on the left
L2

== See also ==
- List of Ahmedabad Metro stations
- Rapid transit in India
