= SP Stadium metro station =

Ahmedabad Metro's Blue Line metro station

SP Stadium
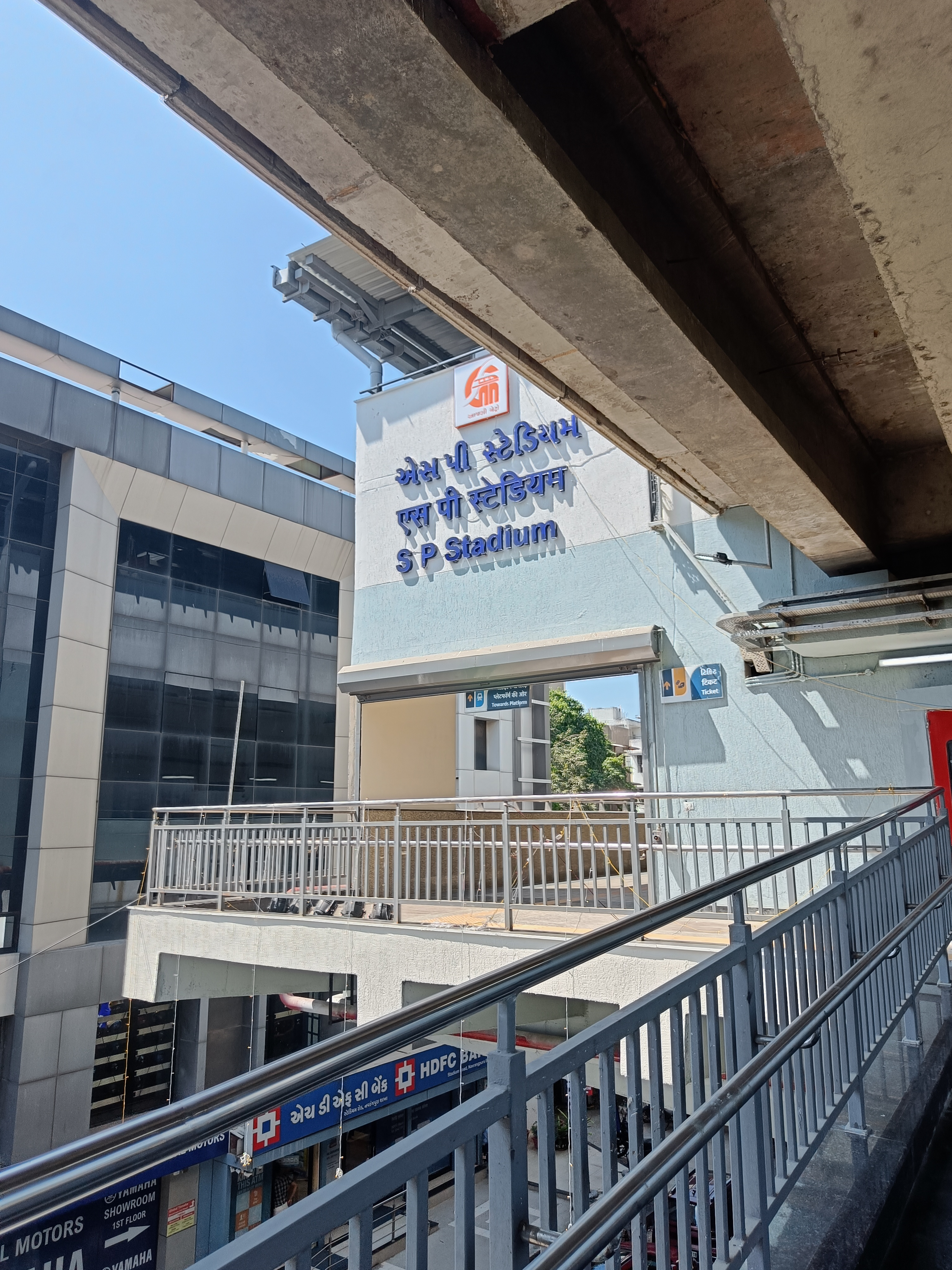

General information
- Location: Kamla Society, Swastik Society, Navrangpura, Ahmedabad, Gujarat 380014
- Coordinates: 23°02′24″N 72°33′42″E
- System: Ahmedabad Metro station
- Owner: Gujarat Metro Rail Corporation Limited
- Operator: Ahmedabad Metro
- Line: Blue Line
- Platforms: 2 (2 side platforms)
- Tracks: 2

Construction
- Structure type: Elevated, Double track
- Accessible: Yes

Other information
- Status: Operational

History
- Opening: 30 September 2022; 3 years ago

Services
Preceding station	Ahmedabad Metro	Following station
Commerce Six Road towards Thaltej Gam	Blue Line	Old High Court towards Vastral Gam
Route map
Location

SP Stadium is an elevated metro station on the East-West Corridor of the Blue Line of Ahmedabad Metro in Ahmedabad, India. This metro station consists of the main Sardar Vallabhbhai Patel Stadium, Ahmedabad along with HL College of Commerce and Joggers Park in Navarangpura. This metro station was opened to the public on 30 September 2022.

== Station layout ==
G	Street level	Exit/Entrance
L1	Mezzanine	Fare control, station agent, Metro Card vending machines, crossover
L2	Side platform | Doors will open on the left
L2	Platform 1 Eastbound	Towards → Vastram Gam; Next Station: Old High Court Change at the next station for Red Line
L2	Platform 2 Westbound	Towards ← Thaltej; Next Station: Commerce Six Road
L2	Side platform | Doors will open on the left
L2

== See also ==
- Ahmedabad
- Gujarat
- List of Ahmedabad Metro stations
- Rapid transit in India
