= Gheekanta metro station =

Ahmedabad Metro's Blue Line metro station

Gheekanta

General information
- Location: Old City, Gheekanta, Bhadra, Ahmedabad, Gujarat 380001
- Coordinates: 23°01′43″N 72°35′13″E
- System: Ahmedabad Metro station
- Owner: Gujarat Metro Rail Corporation Limited
- Operator: Ahmedabad Metro
- Line: Blue Line
- Platforms: 2 (1 island platform)
- Tracks: 2

Construction
- Structure type: Underground, Double track
- Accessible: Yes

Other information
- Status: Operational

History
- Opening: 30 September 2022; 3 years ago

Services
Preceding station	Ahmedabad Metro	Following station
Shahpur towards Thaltej Gam	Blue Line	Kalupur Railway Station towards Vastral Gam
Route map
Location

Gheekanta is an underground metro station on the East-West Corridor of the Blue Line of Ahmedabad Metro in Ahmedabad, India. This metro station consists of the main Gheekanta Metropolitan Courthouse along with Shree Swaminarayan Mandir in Ahmedabad. This metro station was opened to the public on 30 September 2022.

== Station layout ==
G	Street level	Exit/ Entrance
M	Mezzanine	Fare control, station agent, Ticket/token, shops
P	Platform 1 Eastbound	Towards → Vastral Gam; Next Station: Kalupur Railway Station
P	Island platform | Doors will open on the right
P	Platform 2 Westbound	Towards ← Thaltej; Next Station: Shahpur

== See also ==
- Ahmedabad
- Gujarat
- List of Ahmedabad Metro stations
- Rapid transit in India
