= Gurukul Road metro station =

Ahmedabad Metro's Blue Line metro station

Gurukul Road}

General information
- Location: Sushil Nagar Society, Memnagar, Ahmedabad, Gujarat 380052
- Coordinates: 23°02′45″N 72°32′06″E
- System: Ahmedabad Metro station
- Owner: Gujarat Metro Rail Corporation Limited
- Operator: Ahmedabad Metro
- Line: Blue Line
- Platforms: 2 (2side platforms)
- Tracks: 2

Construction
- Structure type: Elevated, Double track
- Accessible: Yes

Other information
- Status: Operational

History
- Opening: 30 September 2022; 3 years ago

Services
Preceding station	Ahmedabad Metro	Following station
Doordarshan Kendra towards Thaltej Gam	Blue Line	Gujarat University towards Vastral Gam
Route map
Location

Gurukul Road is an elevated metro station on the East-West Corridor of the Blue Line of Ahmedabad Metro in Ahmedabad, India. This metro station consists of the main SGVP Swaminarayan Hindu Temple along with the Government District Library in Ahmedabad.

Phase 1 of the metro system was opened to the public on 30 September 2022.

== Station layout ==
G	Street level	Exit/Entrance
L1	Mezzanine	Fare control, station agent, Metro Card vending machines, crossover
L2	Side platform | Doors will open on the left
L2	Platform 1 Eastbound	Towards → Vastram Gam; Next Station: Gujarat University
L2	Platform 2 Westbound	Towards ← Thaltej; Next Station: Doordarshan Kendra
L2	Side platform | Doors will open on the left
L2

== See also ==
- List of Ahmedabad Metro stations
- Rapid transit in India
