= Kankaria East metro station =

Metro station in India

Kankaria East

General information
- Coordinates: 23.0151979°N 72.6044181°E
- System: Ahmedabad Metro station
- Owner: Gujarat Metro Rail Corporation Limited
- Operator: Gujarat Metro Rail Corporation Limited
- Line: Blue Line
- Platforms: Island platform Platform-1 → Vastral Gam; Platform-2 → Thaltej
- Tracks: 2

Construction
- Structure type: Underground
- Platform levels: 2
- Accessible: Yes

History
- Opening: 30 September 2022; 3 years ago
- Electrified: 750 V DC third rail

Services
Preceding station	Ahmedabad Metro	Following station
Kalupur Railway Station towards Thaltej	Blue Line	Apparel Park towards Vastral Gam
Route map
Location

Kankaria East is an underground metro station on the East-West Corridor of the Blue Line of the Ahmedabad Metro in Ahmedabad, India. This metro station consists of the main Kankaria Coach Depot under Indian Railways along with the Jama Masjid and the Rajpur Shri Chintamani Parshwanath Jain Temple. This metro station was inaugurated by Prime Minister Narendra Modi on 30 September 2022.

== Station layout ==
G	Street level	Exit/ Entrance
M	Mezzanine	Fare control, station agent, Ticket/token, shops
P	Platform 1 Eastbound	Towards → Vastral Gam; Next Station: Apparel Park
P	Island platform | Doors will open on the right
P	Platform 2 Westbound	Towards ← Thaltej; Next Station: Kalupur Railway Station

== See also ==
- Ahmedabad
- Gujarat
- List of Ahmedabad Metro stations
- Rapid transit in India
