= Amraiwadi metro station =

Ahmedabad Metro's Blue Line metro station

Amraiwadi
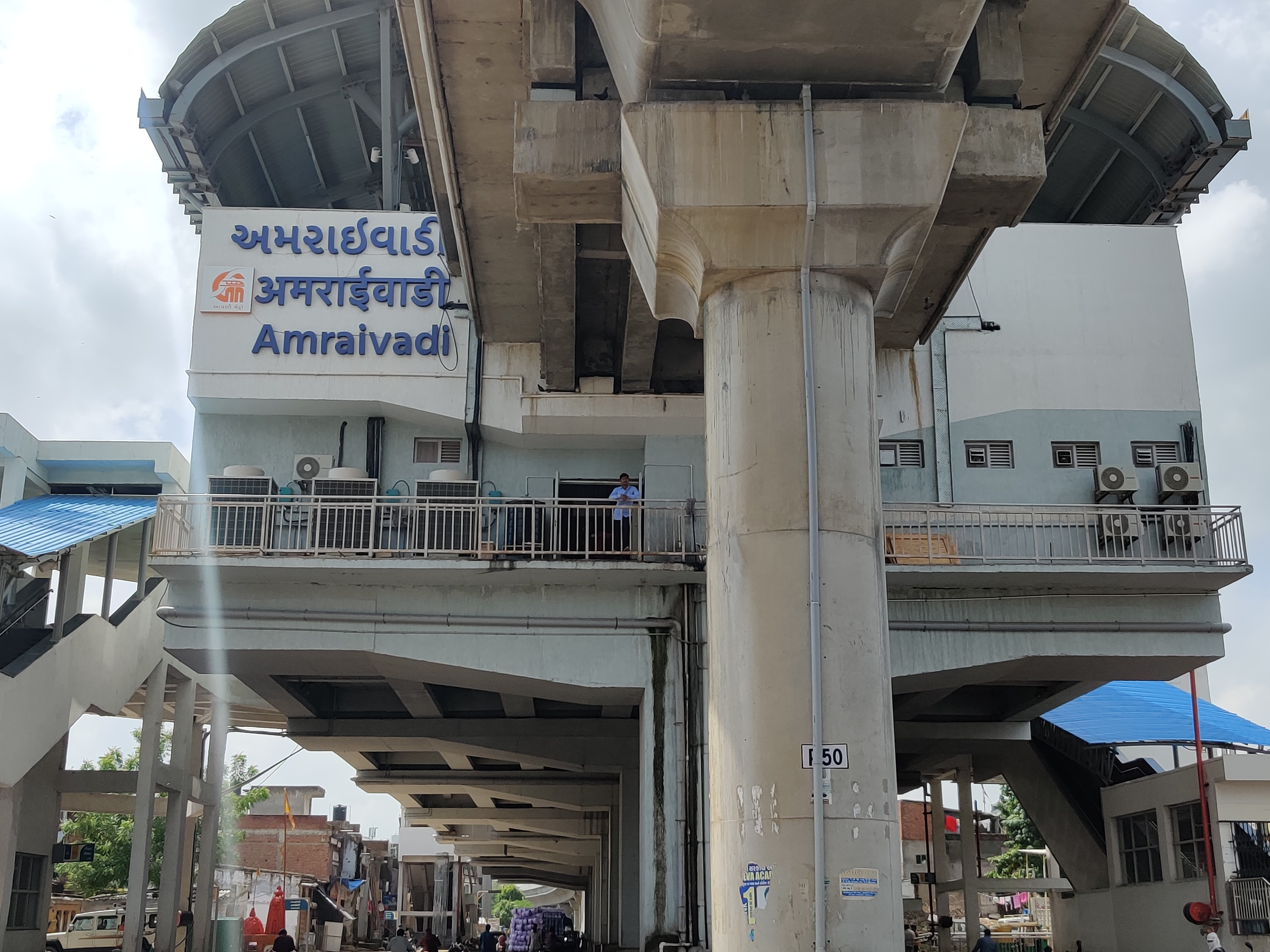

General information
- Location: Rabari Colony, Amraiwadi, Ahmedabad, Gujarat 380026
- Coordinates: 23.00776°N 72.62866°E
- System: Ahmedabad Metro station
- Owner: Gujarat Metro Rail Corporation Limited
- Operator: Ahmedabad Metro
- Line: Blue Line
- Platforms: Side platform Platform-1 → Vastral Gam; Platform-2 → Thaltej
- Tracks: 2

Construction
- Structure type: Elevated, Double track
- Platform levels: 2
- Accessible: Yes

Other information
- Status: Operational

History
- Opening: 18 May 2019; 7 years ago
- Electrified: 750 V DC third rail

Services
| Preceding station | Ahmedabad Metro | Following station |
|---|---|---|
| Apparel Park towards Thaltej | Blue Line | Rabari Colony towards Vastral Gam |
Route map
Location

Amraiwadi is an elevated metro station on the East-West Corridor of the Blue Line of Ahmedabad Metro in Ahmedabad, India. This metro station consists of the main Amraiwadi Post Office along with the National Handloom Corporation located on Lal Bahadur Shastri Road. This metro station was opened to the public on 18 May 2019.

== Station layout ==
| G | Street level | Exit/Entrance |
| L1 | Mezzanine | Fare control, station agent, Metro Card vending machines, crossover |
| L2 | Side platform | Doors will open on the left |
| L2 | Platform 1 Eastbound | Towards → Vastram Gam; Next Station: Rabari Colony |
| L2 | Platform 2 Westbound | Towards ← Thaltej; Next Station: Apparel Park |
| L2 | Side platform | Doors will open on the left |
| L2 |

== See also ==
- List of Ahmedabad Metro stations
- Rapid transit in India
