= Kalupur metro station =

Ahmedabad Metro's Blue Line metro station

Kalupur
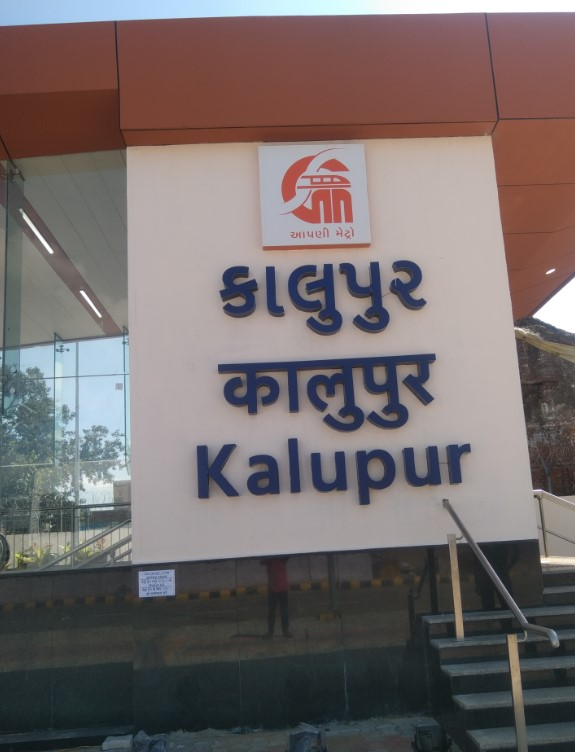

General information
- Location: Saraspur, Ahmedabad, Gujarat 380002
- Coordinates: 23°01′30″N 72°36′11″E
- System: Ahmedabad Metro station
- Owner: Gujarat Metro Rail Corporation Limited
- Operator: Ahmedabad Metro
- Line: Blue Line
- Platforms: 2 (1 island platform)
- Tracks: 2
- Connections: Ahmedabad Junction; Ahmedabad HSR (under-construction)

Construction
- Structure type: Underground, Double track
- Accessible: Yes

Other information
- Status: Operational

History
- Opening: 30 September 2022; 3 years ago

Services
Preceding station	Ahmedabad Metro	Following station
Gheekanta towards Thaltej Gam	Blue Line	Kankaria East towards Vastral Gam
Route map
Location

Kalupur is an underground metro station on the East-West Corridor of the Blue Line of Ahmedabad Metro in Ahmedabad, India. This metro station consists of the main Ahmedabad Junction railway station which leads towards Gandhinagar Capital in the north and towards Nadiad Junction railway station in the south. This metro station was opened to the public on 30 September 2022.

== Station layout ==
G	Street level	Exit/ Entrance
M	Mezzanine	Fare control, station agent, Ticket/token, shops
P	Platform 1 Eastbound	Towards → Vastral Gam; Next Station: Kankaria East
P	Island platform | Doors will open on the right
P	Platform 2 Westbound	Towards ← Thaltej; Next Station: Gheekanta

== Gallery ==
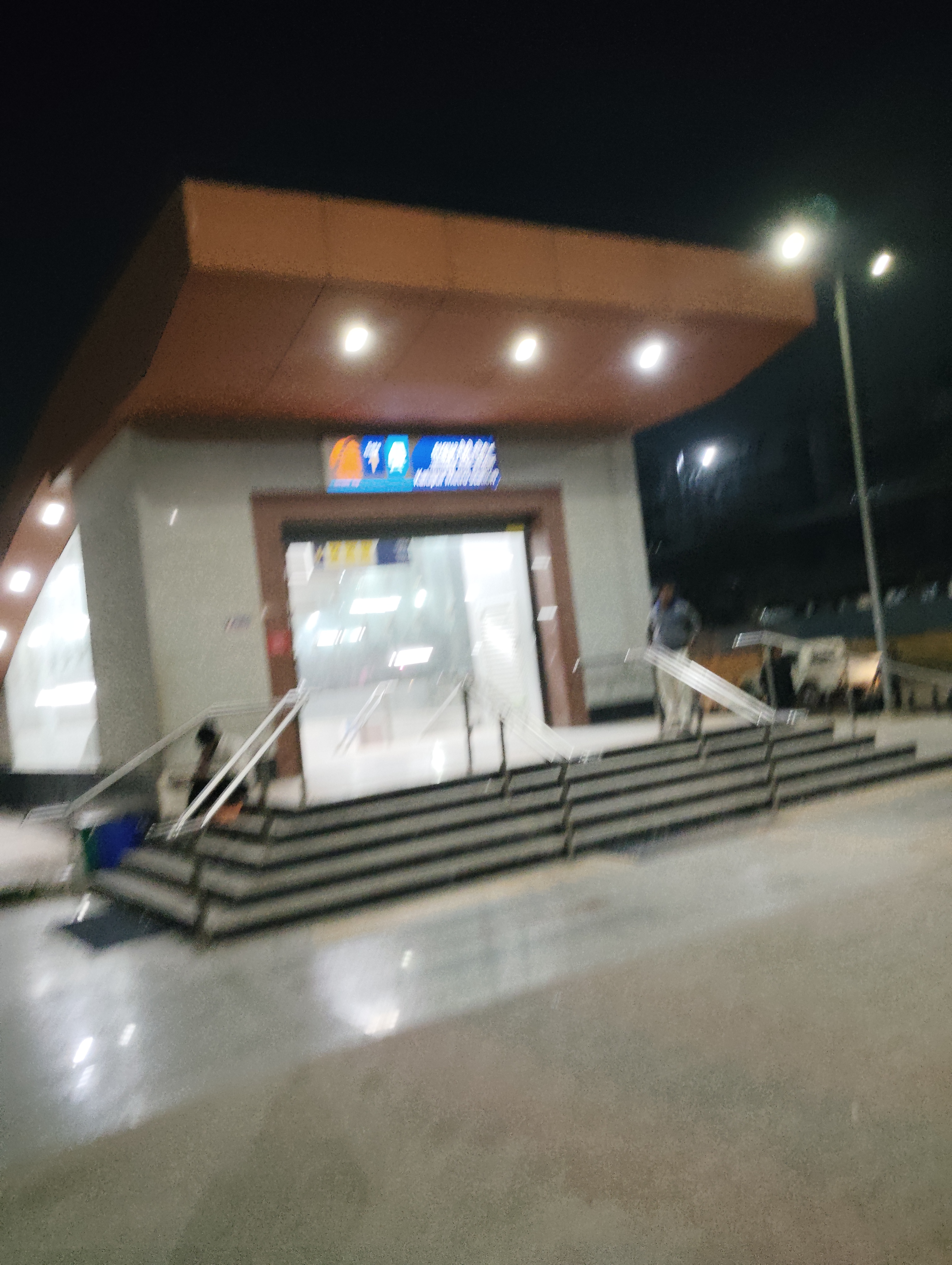
Kalupur Railway Station metro station entrance

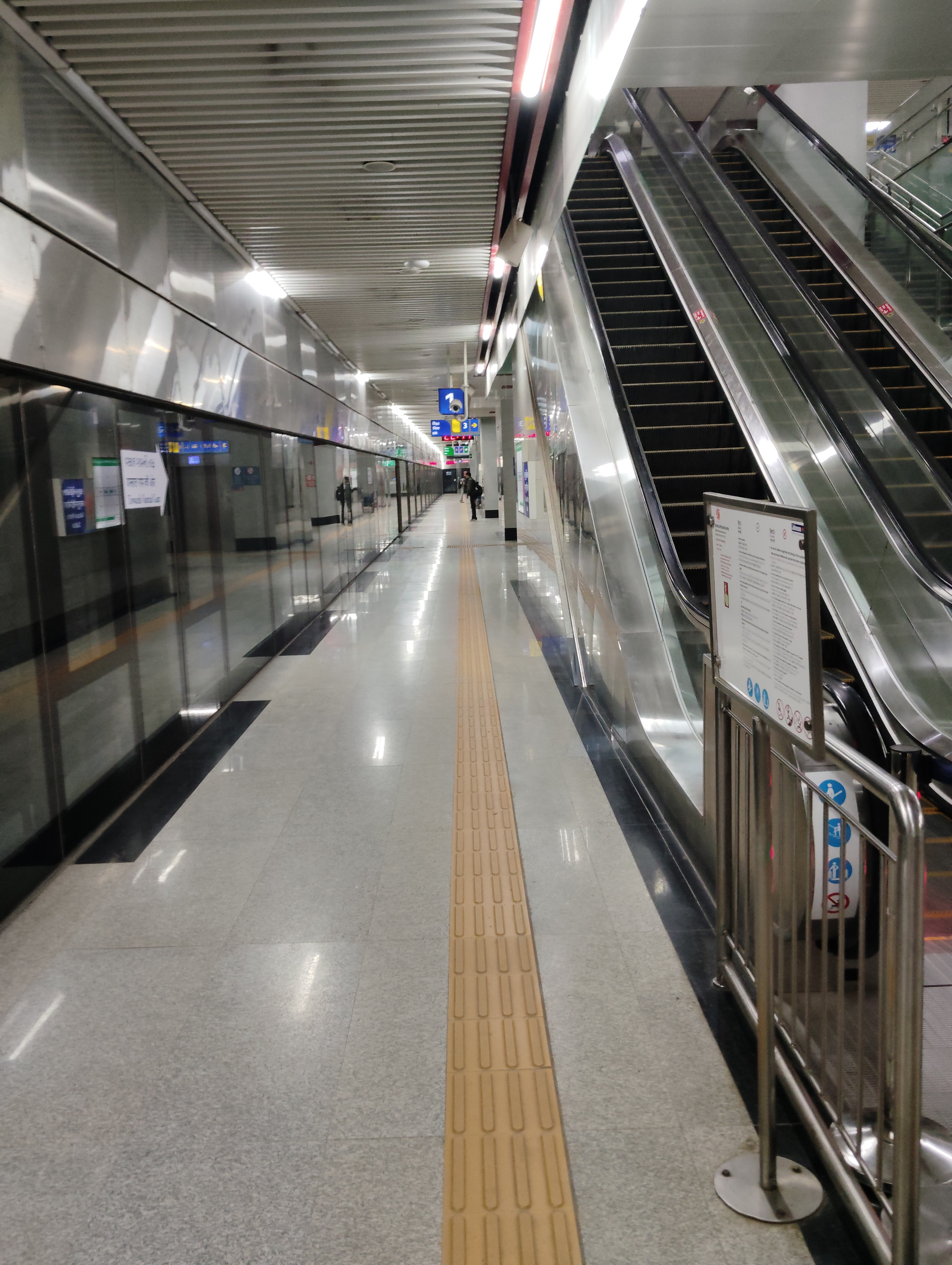
Platform 1

== See also ==
- Ahmedabad
- Gujarat
- List of Ahmedabad Metro stations
- Rapid transit in India
