= Apparel Park metro station =

Ahmedabad Metro's Blue Line metro station

Apparel Park
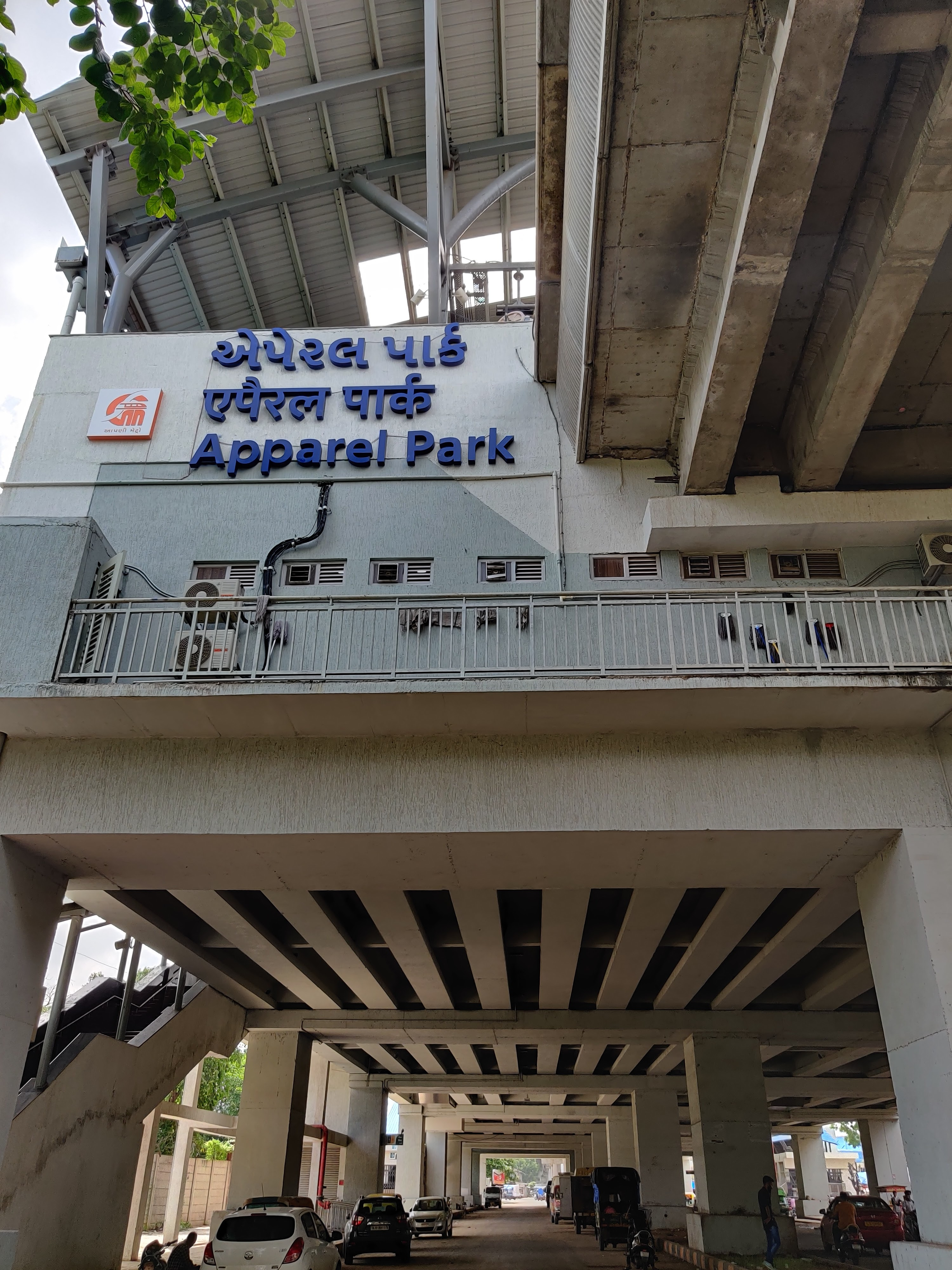

General information
- Location: Janata Nagar, Amraiwadi, Ahmedabad, Gujarat 380021
- Coordinates: 23.01069°N 72.61807°E
- System: Ahmedabad Metro station
- Owner: Gujarat Metro Rail Corporation Limited
- Operator: Ahmedabad Metro
- Line: Blue Line
- Platforms: Side platform Platform-1 → Vastral Gam; Platform-2 → Thaltej
- Tracks: 2

Construction
- Structure type: Elevated, Double track
- Platform levels: 2
- Accessible: Yes

Other information
- Status: Operational

History
- Opening: 4 March 2019; 7 years ago
- Electrified: 750 V DC third rail

Services
| Preceding station | Ahmedabad Metro | Following station |
|---|---|---|
| Kankaria East towards Thaltej | Blue Line | Amraiwadi towards Vastral Gam |
Route map
Location

Apparel Park is an elevated metro station on the East-West Corridor of the Blue Line of Ahmedabad Metro in Ahmedabad, India. It was opened to the public on 4 March 2019. This metro station will be the depot station for the metro trains running in this Blue Line.

== Station layout ==
| G | Street level | Exit/Entrance |
| L1 | Mezzanine | Fare control, station agent, Metro Card vending machines, crossover |
| L2 | Side platform | Doors will open on the left |
| L2 | Platform 1 Eastbound | Towards → Vastram Gam; Next Station: Amraiwadi |
| L2 | Platform 2 Westbound | Towards ← Thaltej; Next Station: Kankaria East |
| L2 | Side platform | Doors will open on the left |
| L2 |

== See also ==
- List of Ahmedabad Metro stations
- Rapid transit in India
