= Old High Court metro station =

Ahmedabad Metro's Blue & Red Line interchange station

Old High Court
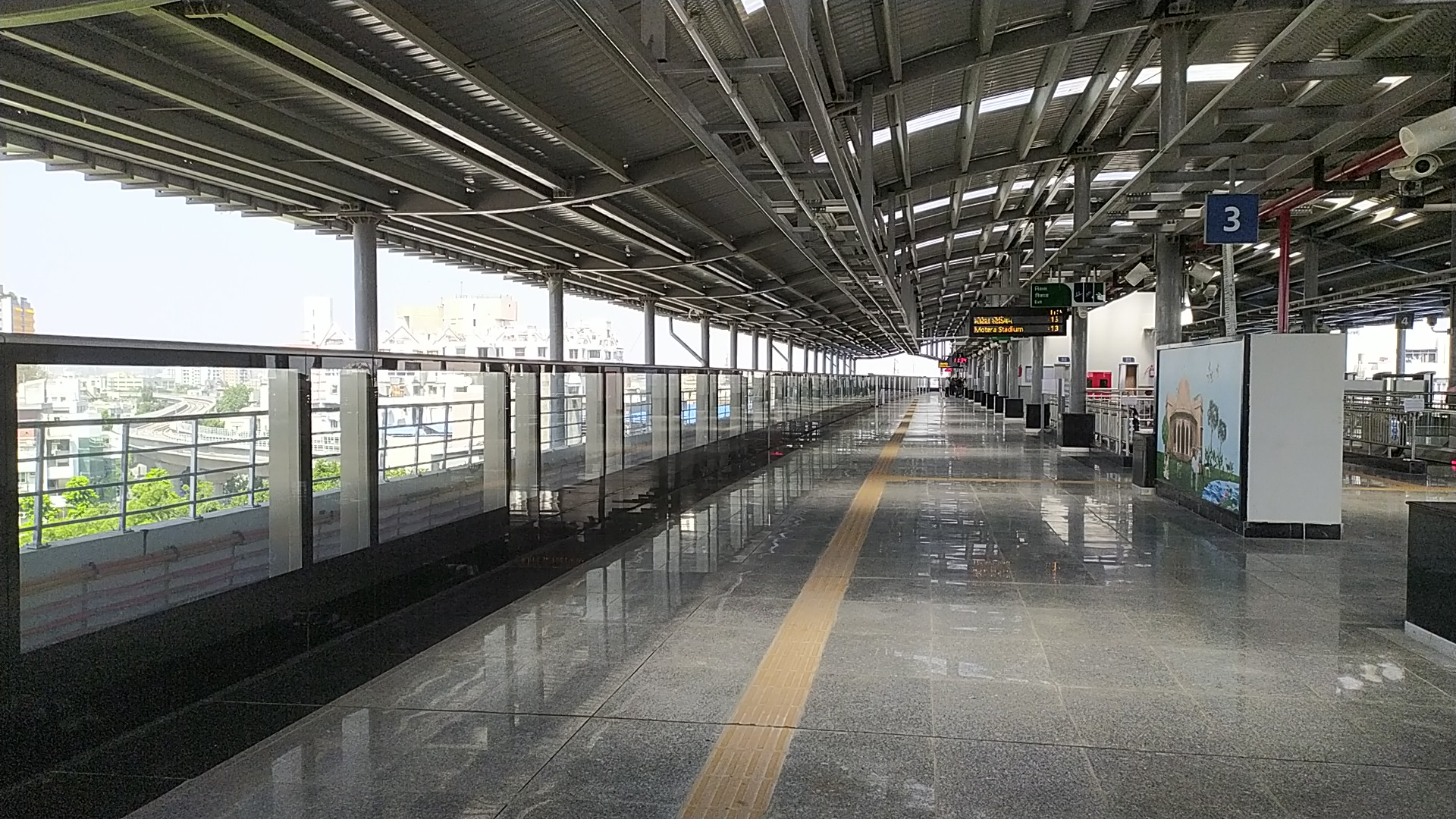
- Red line platform no. 3 of Old High Court metro station

General information
- Location: Shreyas Colony, Navrangpura, Ahmedabad, Gujarat 380009
- Coordinates: 23.03733°N 72.56704°E
- System: Ahmedabad Metro
- Operator: Gujarat Metro Rail Corporation Limited
- Line: Red Line Blue Line
- Platforms: 4; Red Line : 1 island platform; Blue Line : 2 side platforms
- Tracks: 4

Construction
- Structure type: Elevated
- Accessible: Yes

Other information
- Status: Operational

History
- Opened: 30 September 2022; 3 years ago

Services
Preceding station	Ahmedabad Metro	Following station
SP Stadium towards Thaltej Gam	Blue Line	Shahpur towards Vastral Gam
Gandhigram towards APMC	Red Line	Usmanpura towards Mahatma Mandir or GIFT City
Location
- Location within Ahmedabad

Old High Court is an important elevated interchange metro station on the East-West Corridor of the Blue Line and on the North-South Corridor of the Red Line of Ahmedabad Metro in Ahmedabad, India. Around this metro station holds the main Family Court of Ahmedabad along with Sardar Patel Swimming Complex and The Times of India Main Office. It was opened to the public on 30 September 2022 and is the first interchange metro station in the whole of Ahmedabad Metro network.

== Station layout ==
L2
Platforms
Platform 4
Towards → APMC
Next Station: Gandhigram
Island platform
Platform 3
Towards ← Mahatma Mandir or GIFT City

Next Station: Usmanpura

M
Side platform
Platform 1
Towards → Vastral Gam
Next Station: Shahpur
Platform 2
Towards ← Thaltej Gam
Next Station: SP Stadium
Side platform

Fare control, station agent, Metro Card vending machines, crossover
G
Street level
Exit/Entrance

== See also ==
- Ahmedabad
- Gujarat
- List of Ahmedabad Metro stations
- Rapid transit in India
