= Usmanpura metro station =

Ahmedabad Metro's Red Line metro station

Usmanpura

General information
- Location: Sattar Taluka Society, Usmanpura, Ahmedabad, Gujarat 380014
- Coordinates: 23.04600°N 72.56498°E
- System: Ahmedabad Metro station
- Owner: Gujarat Metro Rail Corporation Limited
- Operator: Ahmedabad Metro
- Line: Red Line
- Platforms: Side platform Platform-1 → Mahatma Mnadir/GIFT City / GIFT City; Platform-2 → APMC
- Tracks: 2

Construction
- Structure type: Elevated, Double track
- Platform levels: 2
- Accessible: Yes

Other information
- Status: Operational

History
- Opened: 6 October 2022; 3 years ago
- Electrified: 750 V DC third rail

Services
Preceding station	Ahmedabad Metro	Following station
Old High Court towards APMC	Red Line	Vijay Nagar towards Mahatma Mandir or GIFT City
Route map
Location

Usmanpura is an elevated metro station on the North-South Corridor of the Red Line of Ahmedabad Metro in Ahmedabad, India. Around this metro station holds the main Hyatt Regency (Ahmedabad) along with Saviour Hospital in north Ahmedabad. This metro station was inaugurated on 30 September 2022 by Prime Minister Narendra Modi and was opened to the public on 6 October 2022.

== Station layout ==
G
Street level
Exit/Entrance
L1
Mezzanine
Fare control, station agent, Metro Card vending machines, crossover

L2
Side platform | Doors will open on the left
Platform 2
Southbound
Towards → APMC
Next Station: Old High Court Change at the next station for Blue Line
Platform 1
Northbound
Towards ← Mahatma Mandir / GIFT City

Next Station: Vijay Nagar

Side platform | Doors will open on the left
L2

== See also ==
- Ahmedabad
- Gujarat
- List of Ahmedabad Metro stations
- Rapid transit in India
