= Doordarshan Kendra metro station =

Ahmedabad Metro's Blue Line metro station

Doordarshan Kendra
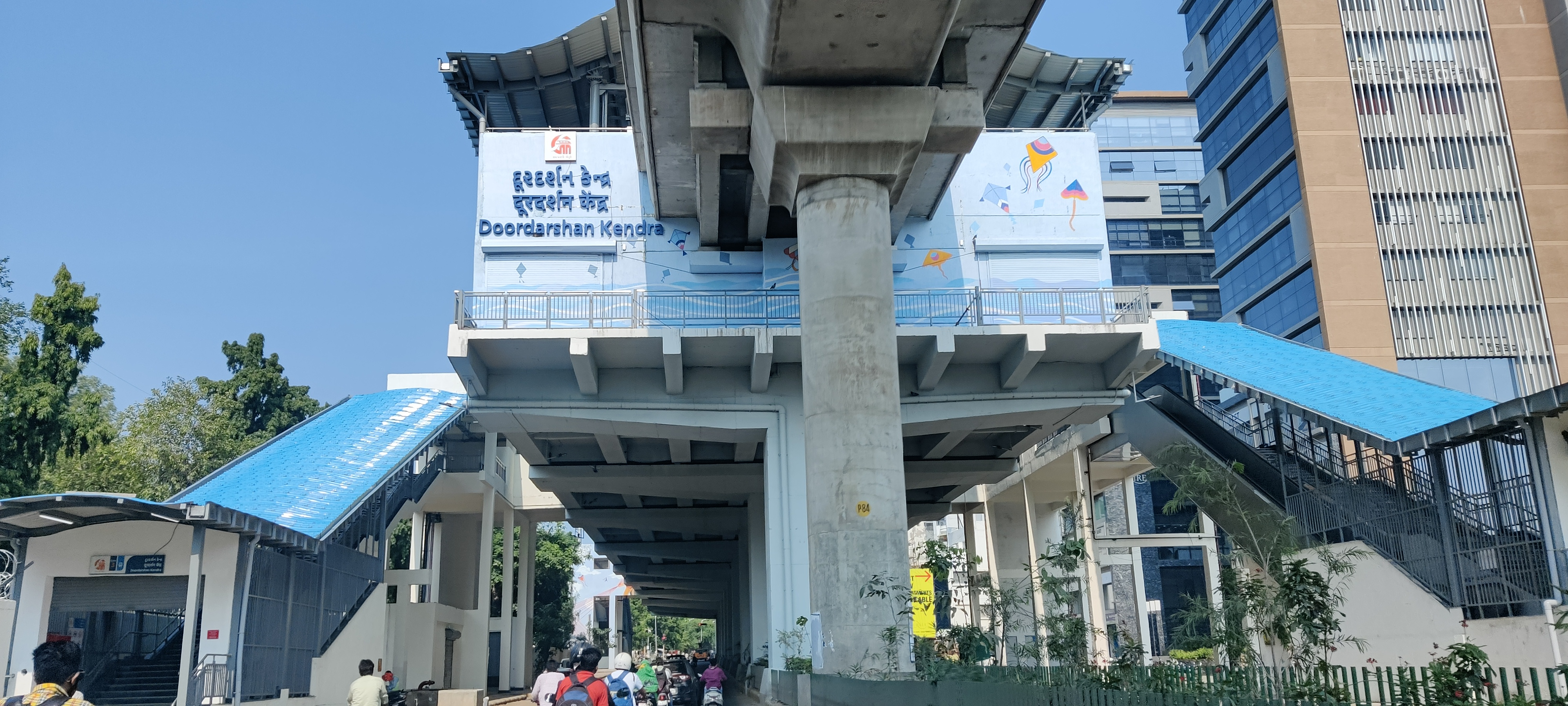

General information
- Location: Sunrise Park, Gurukul, Ahmedabad, Gujarat 380052
- Coordinates: 23°02′53″N 72°31′28″E
- System: Ahmedabad Metro station
- Owner: Gujarat Metro Rail Corporation Limited
- Operator: Ahmedabad Metro
- Line: Blue Line
- Platforms: 2 (2 side platforms)
- Tracks: 2

Construction
- Structure type: Elevated, Double track
- Accessible: Yes

Other information
- Status: Operational

History
- Opening: 30 September 2022; 3 years ago

Services
Preceding station	Ahmedabad Metro	Following station
Thaltej Terminus	Blue Line	Gurukul Road towards Vastral Gam
Route map
Location

Doordarshan Kendra is an elevated metro station on the East-West Corridor of the Blue Line of Ahmedabad Metro in Ahmedabad, India. This metro station consists of the main Doordarshan Kendra (Ahmedabad) along with its adjacent Ahmedabad Education Society Ground and SKUM College of Physiotherapy. This phase of the metro system was opened to the public on 30 September 2022.

== Station layout ==
G	Street level	Exit/Entrance
L1	Mezzanine	Fare control, station agent, Metro Card vending machines, crossover
L2	Side platform | Doors will open on the left
L2	Platform 1 Eastbound	Towards → Vastram Gam; Next Station: Gurukul Road
L2	Platform 2 Westbound	Towards ← Thaltej
L2	Side platform | Doors will open on the left
L2

== See also ==
- Ahmedabad
- Gujarat
- List of Ahmedabad Metro stations
- Rapid transit in India
