= Pink Line (Ahmedabad Metro) =

Proposed airport metro corridor in Ahmedabad, India

Overview
- Status: Approved
- Locale: Ahmedabad; Gandhinagar
- Termini: Koteshwar Road; SVPI Airport
- Stations: 6

Service
- Type: Rapid Transit
- System: Ahmedabad Metro
- Operator: Gujarat Metro Rail Corporation Limited

Technical
- Line length: 6.032 km (3.748 mi)
- Character: Elevated & Underground

The Pink Line is a planned extension of the Ahmedabad Metro rapid transit system in Ahmedabad, Gujarat, India. The corridor is intended to connect Koteshwar Road with Sardar Vallabhbhai Patel International Airport.

The Union Cabinet of India approved the project on 10 June 2026 at an estimated cost of ₹2,169.04 crore. The extension will measure approximately 6.032 kilometres and comprise five new stations, including four elevated stations and one underground station.

== History ==
The airport extension was proposed to improve public transport connectivity between Ahmedabad and Sardar Vallabhbhai Patel International Airport.

The project forms part of the continued expansion of the Ahmedabad Metro network, which serves Ahmedabad, Gandhinagar and surrounding areas.

On 10 June 2026, the Union Cabinet approved Ahmedabad Metro Phase 2A, connecting Koteshwar Road with the airport.

The extension was approved with an estimated project cost of ₹2,169.04 crore.

== List of stations ==
Following is a list of stations on this route:

Pink Line
#	Station Name		Opened	Connections	Layout
#	English	Gujarati	Opened	Connections	Layout
1	Koteshwar Road	કોટેશ્વર રોડ	Approved	Yellow Line	Elevated
2	Ashram Road	આશ્રમ રોડ	Approved	None	Elevated
3	Koteshwar Prachin Mandir	કોટેશ્વર પ્રાચીન મંદિર	Approved	None	Elevated
4	Sabarmati River	સાબરમતી નદી	Approved	None	Elevated
5	Sardarnagar	સરદારનગર	Approved	None	Elevated
6	SVPI Airport	એસ વી પી આઈ એરપોર્ટ	Approved	SVPI Airport	Underground

== Infrastructure ==
The corridor is planned as a rapid transit extension of the Ahmedabad Metro network. It will comprise approximately 6.032 km of metro infrastructure, including four elevated stations and one underground station.

The project is being developed by Gujarat Metro Rail Corporation.

The extension will form part of the wider metro system connecting Ahmedabad, Gandhinagar and nearby urban areas.

Information about project development, procurement and construction is published by Gujarat Metro Rail Corporation.
