= Violet Line (Ahmedabad Metro) =

Railway line in Ahmedabad, India

Overview
- Status: Operational
- Locale: Gandhinagar
- Termini: GNLU; GIFT City
- Stations: 3

Service
- Type: Rapid Transit
- System: Ahmedabad Metro
- Operator: Gujarat Metro Rail Corporation Limited
- Rolling stock: Hyundai Rotem

History
- Opened: 16 September 2024; 2 years ago

Technical
- Line length: 5.42 km (3.37 mi)
- Character: Elevated
- Track gauge: 1,435 mm (4 ft 8 1/2 in) (Standard gauge)
- Electrification: 750V DC Third Rail
Route map
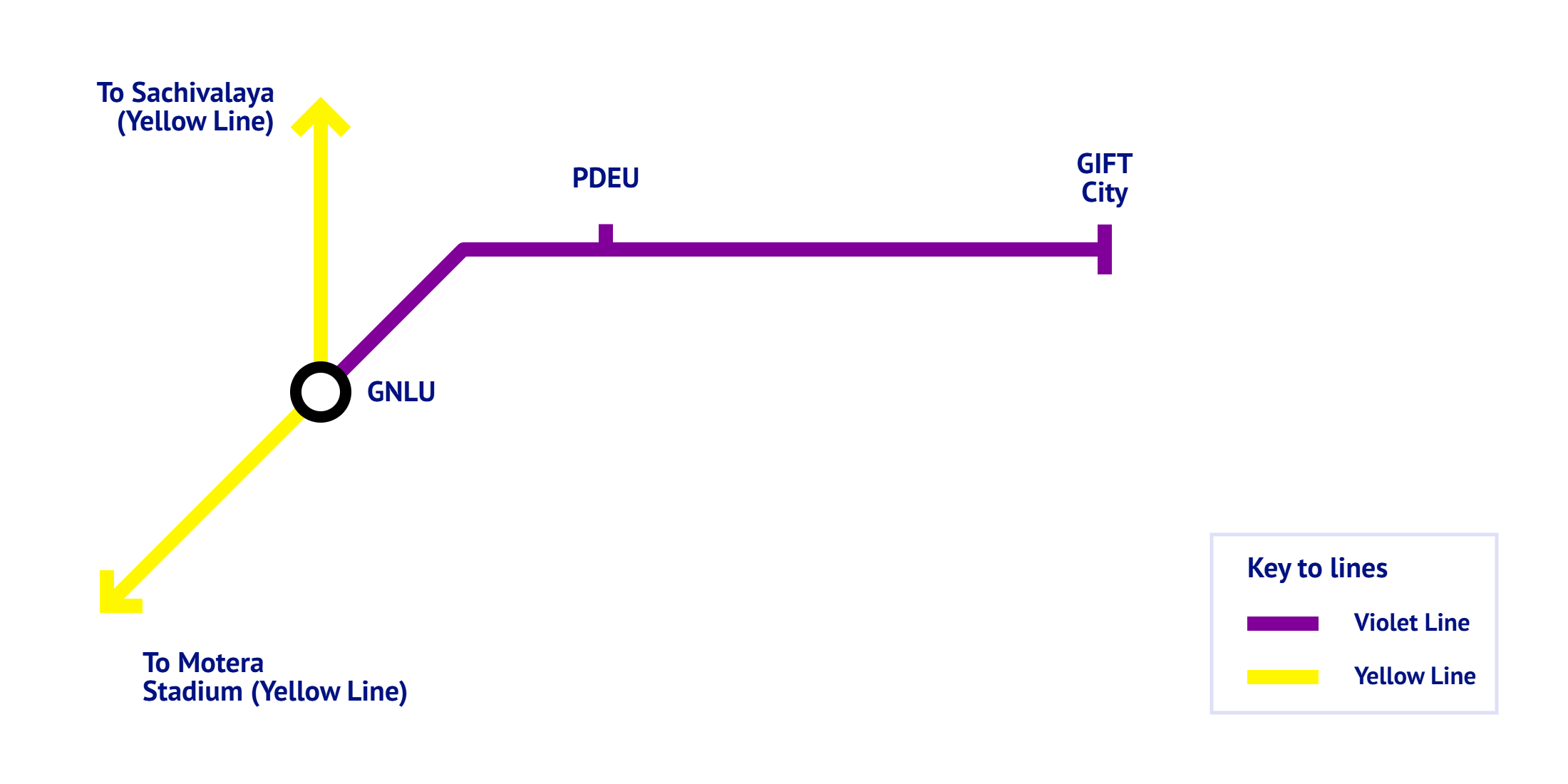

The Violet Line of the Ahmedabad Metro is a metro route of the mass rapid transit system in Ahmedabad, India. The construction was started in January 2021 and was completed in September 2024.

== History ==
The Government of Gujarat approved the Phase-2 of Ahmedabad Metro in October 2017 and revised it in October 2018. In February 2019, the Union cabinet approved the Phase-2 worth cost of ₹5,384.17 crore (US$580 million). It will extend the north–south corridor from Motera Stadium in Ahmedabad to Mahatma Mandir in Gandhinagar (23.838 km (14.812 mi)) with a branch line from Gujarat National Law University (GNLU) linking Pandit Deendayal Energy University (PDEU) and GIFT City (5.416 km).

The tendering for the Phase 2 began in January 2020. On 18 January 2021, the foundation stone of the Phase-2 was laid by Prime Minister Modi. In February 2023, Titagarh Rail Systems won a contract worth ₹350 crore (US$37 million) for providing rolling stock for the Phase-2.

The trial run of Phase-2 started in February 2024 between GNLU and Dholakuva Circle stations. The Violet Line with all three stations was inaugurated on 16 September 2024 by Prime Minister Narendra Modi and was open to the public on 17 September 2024.

In April 2026, under Phase 2B, the Gujarat Metro Rail Corporation Limited (GMRC) invited the bids for extension of the Violet Line from GIFT City to Shahpur Circle with 3.33 km-long elevated corridor and 3 stations; at the cost of ₹290.33 crore (US$31 million). The approved stations are GIFT City House, Gujarat Biotechnology University and Shahpur.

The GMRC also submitted a proposal to the Ministry of Housing and Urban Affairs to extend the Violet Line to construct a 6 to 10 km (3.7 to 6.2 mi) elevated circular loop within GIFT City. The estimated cost for the construction is ₹2,000 crore (US$210 million). The project is expected to add four to six metro stations to connect the different campuses within the city. Another proposal includes extension of Violet Line to IIT Gandhinagar. This 7 km (4.3 mi) route will have six stations and will cost around ₹1,750 crore (US$190 million).

== List of stations ==
Following is a list of stations on this route:

Violet Line
#	Station Name		Opened	Connections	Layout
#	English	Gujarati	Opened	Connections	Layout
1	Shahpur	શાહપુર	Under construction	None	Elevated
2	Gujarat Biotechnology University	ગુજરાત બાયોટેકનોલોજી યુનિવર્સિટી	Under construction	None	Elevated
3	GIFT City House	ગિફ્ટ સિટી હાઉસ	Under construction	None	Elevated
4	GIFT City	ગિફ્ટ સિટી	17 September 2024	None	Elevated
5	PDEU	પી ડી ઈ યુ	17 September 2024	None	Elevated
6	GNLU	જી એન એલ યુ	17 September 2024	Yellow Line	Elevated

== Map ==
Click on icons for more details
