= Sanjay Gupta (disambiguation) =

Sanjay Gupta (born 1969) is an American neurosurgeon and medical reporter.

Sanjay Gupta may also refer to:

- Sanjay Gupta MD, a CNN medical news program he hosts
- Sanjay Gupta (businessman) (1963–2021), Indian businessman, CEO of the Neesa Group
- Sanjay Gupta (comics) (born 1966), Indian comic book writer and editor
- Sanjay Gupta (director) (1969–2026), Indian Bollywood writer and director
- Sanjay Gupta (Bihar politician), Indian politician, member of the Bihar Legislative Assembly
- Sanjay Gupta (Uttarakhand politician), Indian politician, member of the Uttarakhand Legislative Assembly
- Sanjay Gupta (business executive), Indian business executive
- Sanjay Gupta, Editor & CEO of Jagran Prakashan Limited, publishers of Dainik Jagran
