= Blue Line (Ahmedabad Metro) =

Overview
- Status: Operational
- Locale: Ahmedabad
- Termini: Thaltej Gam; Vastral Gam
- Stations: 18

Service
- Type: Rapid Transit
- System: Ahmedabad Metro
- Operator(s): Gujarat Metro Rail Corporation Limited
- Rolling stock: Hyundai Rotem

History
- Opened: 4 March 2019; 7 years ago
- Last extension: 2024

Technical
- Line length: 21.23 km (13.19 mi)
- Character: Elevated and underground
- Track gauge: 1,435 mm (4 ft 8 1/2 in) (Standard gauge)
- Electrification: 750V DC Third Rail

The Blue Line of the Ahmedabad Metro is the first metro line of the Ahmedabad city's mass rapid transit rail. It consists of 18 metro stations, starting from Vastral Gam and ending at Thaltej Gam, with a total distance of 21.23 km (13.19 mi), with most of the it being elevated.

== History ==
The ground breaking ceremony was held on 14 March 2015 for the construction of 6.5 km (4.0 mi) long Vastral – Apparel Park stretch of Blue Line of the Phase-1 in presence of then Gujarat Chief Minister, Anandiben Patel. The work started in March 2016. The trial runs were carried out on the section in February 2019. The section was inaugurated on 4 March 2019 by Indian Prime Minister Narendra Modi along with Chief Minister of Gujarat Vijay Rupani and Deputy Chief Minister Nitinbhai Patel. It opened to the public on 6 March 2019. Except 1.4 km (0.87 mi)-long Thaltej-Thaltej Gam section and two metro stations, Thaltej Gam and Kankaria East, the Phase-1 was inaugurated on 30 September 2022 by Prime Minister Modi. The Blue Line was opened to public on 2 October 2022. On opening day, total 41,700 tickets were sold, generating revenue of ₹6 lakh (US$6,300), and total 72 trips were made. On next day, 17,000 people travelled on 44 trips. The Kankaria East station was opened on 5 March 2024. Thaltej Gam station and adjoining 1.4 km (0.870 mi)-long section leading to Thaltej station were opened on 8 December 2024.

Under Phase 3A, the Blue Line will be extended from Thaltej Gam to Godhavi with two distinct elevated corridors with total 10.8 km (6.7 mi) long corridor with nine stations: 3.313 km long Thaltej Gam to Canal Road Metro Station corridor with three elevated stations and 7.505 km long Canal Road Metro Station to Godhavi Metro-cum-Rapid Rail Transit System hybrid corridor with six stations. This extension will connect to upcoming SWASA (South West Ahmedabad Sports Arena) and further to Sanand.

== Features ==
While connecting Vastral Gam to Thaltej Gam, this line will be passing through Nirant Cross Road, Vastral, Rabari Colony, Amraiwadi, Apparel Park, Kankaria East, Kalupur Railway Station, Ghee Kanta, Shahpur, Old High Court, Stadium, Commerce Six Road, Gujarat University, Gurukul Road, Doordarshan Kendra, Thaltej and Thaltej Gam stations.

The total distance of the corridor is 21.23 km (13.19 mi) with most of the it being elevated. The underground section is approximately 6.5 km (4.0 mi) in length with 4 underground stations, while the elevated section has 14 elevated stations. Old High Court station serves as an interchange station for the Blue Line and Red Line.

The underground section is constructed about 22 metre deep at the lowest level near Gheekanta station. The other three underground stations are about 12-14 metres deep.

== List of stations ==
Following is a list of stations on this route:

Blue Line
#	Station Name		Opening	Connections	Layout
#	English	Gujarati	Opening	Connections	Layout
1	Thaltej Gam	થલતેજ ગામ	8 December 2024	None	Elevated
2	Thaltej	થલતેજ	30 September 2022	None	Elevated
3	Doordarshan Kendra	દૂરદર્શન કેન્દ્ર	30 September 2022	None	Elevated
4	Gurukul Road	ગુરુકુલ રોડ	30 September 2022	Ahmedabad BRTS	Elevated
5	Gujarat University	ગુજરાત યુનિવર્સિટી	30 September 2022	None	Elevated
6	Commerce Six Road	કોમર્સ છ રસ્તા	30 September 2022	None	Elevated
7	SP Stadium	એસ પી સ્ટેડિયમ	30 September 2022	None	Elevated
8	Old High Court	જૂની હાઇ કોર્ટ	30 September 2022	Red Line	Elevated
9	Shahpur	શાહપુર	30 September 2022	None	Underground
10	Gheekanta	ઘીકાંટા	30 September 2022	None	Underground
11	Kalupur	કાલુપુર	30 September 2022	Ahmedabad Junction Ahmedabad HSR (under-construction)	Underground
12	Kankaria East	કાંકરિયા પૂર્વ	5 March 2024	None	Underground
13	Apparel Park	એપેરલ પાર્ક	4 March 2019	None	Elevated
14	Amraiwadi	અમરાઈવાડી	18 May 2019	None	Elevated
15	Rabari Colony	રબારી કોલોની	4 March 2019	Ahmedabad BRTS	Elevated
16	Vastral	વસ્ત્રાલ	4 March 2019	None	Elevated
17	Nirant Cross Road	નિરાંત ક્રોસ રોડ	4 March 2019	None	Elevated
18	Vastral Gam	વસ્ત્રાલ ગામ	4 March 2019	None	Elevated

== Construction ==
The Gujarat Metro Rail Corporation (GMRC) Limited has divided the construction work of the 20.73 km long Blue Line of Ahmedabad Metro into multiple construction packages.

The list of contractors is as follows:

Sr. No	Package	No. of Stations	Contractor
1.	Vastral Gam – Apparel Park	Viaduct only	J. Kumar Infraprojects
2.	Vastral Gam – Apparel Park	6	DRA Infracon-CICO JV
3.	Apparel Park Depot	Depot only	URC Construction
4.	Kalupur – West Ramp	2	Larsen and Toubro
5.	Thaltej – Thaltej Gam	2	DRA Infracon
6.	East Ramp – Kalupur	2	Afcons Infrastructure

== Map ==
Click on icons for more details
