= List of Ahmedabad Metro stations =

This is a list of all stations of the Ahmedabad Metro, a rapid transit system serving Ahmedabad, India.

Ahmedabad Metro is the 12th metro system in India.

It was built and is operated by the Gujarat Metro Rail Corporation Limited. Its first section was inaugurated on 4 March 2019 and opened to the public on 6 March 2019, with the East-West Corridor. The 1.4 km-long Thaltej-Thaltej Gam section and three metro stations (Kankaria East, Thaltej Gam and Sabarmati) were expected to be completed by December 2023. The rest of Phase-1 was inaugurated on 30 September 2022. The East-West corridor and the North-South corridor were opened to the public on 2 October 2022 and 6 October 2022 respectively.

The trial run of Phase 2 started in February 2024 between GNLU and Dholakuva Circle stations. The Yellow Line connecting Sector 1 station of Gandhinagar with the Red Line's Motera Stadium along with six new stations on Yellow Line were inaugurated on 16 September 2024 by Prime Minister Narendra Modi and was open to the public on 17 September 2024. Seven new stations on Yellow Line were opened to public on 27 April 2025. Juna Koba and Koba Gaam stations were opened on 28 September 2025. The final 5.36-kilometre corridor of the Yellow Line, from Sachivalaya (Secretariat) to Mahatma Mandir, was inaugurated on 11 January 2026 by Prime Minister Modi.

== Metro stations ==
†	Terminal station
*	Transfer station
††	Transfer station to Indian Railways / ISBT

Station name		Line	Opened	Layout	Platform layout	Notes	Refs
English	Gujarati	Line	Opened	Layout	Platform layout	Notes	Refs
AEC	એ ઇ સી	Red Line	September 30, 2022	Elevated	Side	–	
Amraiwadi	અમરાઈવાડી	Blue Line	March 4, 2019	Elevated	Side	–	
APMC †	એ પી એમ સી	Red Line	September 30, 2022	Elevated	Side	–	
Apparel Park †	એપેરલ પાર્ક	Blue Line	March 4, 2019	Elevated	Side	–	
Commerce Six Road	કોમર્સ છ રસ્તા	Blue Line	September 30, 2022	Elevated	Side	–	
Doordarshan Kendra	દૂરદર્શન કેન્દ્ર	Blue Line	September 30, 2022	Elevated	Side	–	
Gandhigram	ગાંધીગ્રામ	Red Line	September 30, 2022	Elevated	Side	–	
Gheekanta	ઘીકાંટા	Blue Line	September 30, 2022	Underground	Island	–	
Gujarat University	ગુજરાત યુનિવર્સિટી	Blue Line	September 30, 2022	Elevated	Side	–	
Gurukul Road	ગુરુકુળ રોડ	Blue Line	September 30, 2022	Elevated	Side	–	
Jivraj Park	જીવરાજ પાર્ક	Red Line	September 30, 2022	Elevated	Side	–	
Kalupur Railway Station	કાલુપુર રેલ્વે સ્ટેશન	Blue Line	September 30, 2022	Underground	Island	–	
Kankaria East	કાંકરિયા પૂર્વ	Blue Line	September 30, 2022	Underground	Island	–	
Motera Stadium †	મોટેરા સ્ટેડિયમ	Red Line; Yellow Line	September 30, 2022	Elevated	Side	–	
Nirant Cross Road	નિરાંત ક્રોસ રોડ	Blue Line	March 4, 2019	Elevated	Side	–	
Old High Court	જૂની હાઇ કોર્ટ	Red Line; Blue Line	September 30, 2022	Elevated	Island (Red Line); Side (Blue Line)	–	
Paldi	પાલડી	Red Line	September 30, 2022	Elevated	Side	–	
Rabari Colony	રબારી કોલોની	Blue Line	March 4, 2019	Elevated	Side	–	
Rajiv Nagar	રાજીવ નગર	Red Line	September 30, 2022	Elevated	Side	–	
Ranip	રાણીપ	Red Line	September 30, 2022	Elevated	Side	–	
Sabarmati	સાબરમતી	Red Line	September 30, 2022	Elevated	Side	–	
Sabarmati Railway Station	સાબરમતી રેલવે સ્ટેશન	Red Line	Under construction	Elevated	Side	–	
Shahpur	શાહપુર	Blue Line	September 30, 2022	Underground	Island	–	
Shreyas	શ્રેયસ	Red Line	September 30, 2022	Elevated	Side	–	
SP Stadium	એસ પી સ્ટેડિયમ	Blue Line	September 30, 2022	Elevated	Side	–	
Thaltej	થલતેજ	Blue Line	September 30, 2022	Elevated	Side	–	
Usmanpura	ઉસ્માનપુરા	Red Line	September 30, 2022	Elevated	Side	–	
Vadaj	વાડજ	Red Line	September 30, 2022	Elevated	Side	–	
Vastral	વસ્ત્રાલ	Blue Line	March 4, 2019	Elevated	Side	–	
Vastral Gam †	વસ્ત્રાલ ગામ	Blue Line	March 4, 2019	Elevated	Side	–	
Vijay Nagar	વિજય નગર	Red Line	September 30, 2022	Elevated	Side	–	
Sector-1 (Gandhinagar)	સેક્ટર-1	Yellow Line	September 17, 2024	Elevated	Side	–	
Infocity	ઇન્ફોસિટી	Yellow Line	September 17, 2024	Elevated	Side	–	
Dholakuva Circle	ધોળાકુવા સર્કલ	Yellow Line	September 17, 2024	Elevated	Side	–	
Randesan	રાંદેસણ	Yellow Line	September 17, 2024	Elevated	Side	–	
GNLU	જી એન એલ યુ	Yellow Line; Violet Line	September 17, 2024	Elevated	Side	–	
Raysan	રાયસણ	Yellow Line	September 17, 2024	Elevated	Side	–	
Koba Circle	કોબા સર્કલ	Yellow Line	April 27, 2025	Elevated	Side	–	
Narmada Canal	નર્મદા કેનાલ	Yellow Line	April 27, 2025	Elevated	Side	–	
Tapovan Circle	તપોવન સર્કલ	Yellow Line	April 27, 2025	Elevated	Side	–	
Vishwakarma College	વિશ્વકર્મા કોલેજ	Yellow Line	April 27, 2025	Elevated	Side	–	
Koteshwar Road	કોટેશ્વર રોડ	Yellow Line	April 27, 2025	Elevated	Side	–	
Sector-10A (Gandhinagar)	સેક્ટર-10એ	Yellow Line	April 27, 2025	Elevated	Side	–	
Sachivalaya	સચિવાલય	Yellow Line	April 27, 2025	Elevated	Side	–	
PDEU	પી ડી ઈ યુ	Violet Line	September 17, 2024	Elevated	Side	–	
GIFT City	ગિફ્ટ સિટી	Violet Line	September 17, 2024	Elevated	Side	–	
Thaltej Gam	થલતેજ ગામ	Blue Line	December 8, 2024	Elevated	Side	–	
Juna Koba	જૂના કોબા	Yellow Line	28 September 2025	Elevated	Side	–	
Koba Gam	કોબા ગામ	Yellow Line	28 September 2025	Elevated	Side	–	
Akshardham	અક્ષરધામ	Yellow Line	11 January 2026	Elevated	Side	–	
Juna Sachivalaya	જૂના સચિવાલય	Yellow Line	11 January 2026	Elevated	Side	–	
Sector-16 (Gandhinagar)	સેક્ટર-16	Yellow Line	11 January 2026	Elevated	Side	–	
Sector-24 (Gandhinagar)	સેક્ટર-24	Yellow Line	11 January 2026	Elevated	Side	–	
Mahatma Mandir	મહાત્મા મંદિર	Yellow Line	11 January 2026	Elevated	Side	–	

== Statistics ==
Total number of metro stations	54
Number of interchange stations	3
Number of elevated stations	50
Number of underground stations	4
Number of stations at-grade	0

== See also ==
- List of Chennai Metro stations
- List of Coimbatore Metro stations
- List of Delhi Metro stations
- List of Hyderabad Metro stations
- List of Jaipur Metro stations
- List of Kochi Metro stations
- List of Kolkata Metro stations
- List of Lucknow Metro stations
- List of Madurai Metro stations
- List of Mumbai Metro stations
- List of Noida Metro stations
- List of Nagpur Metro stations
- List of Namma Metro stations
- List of Navi Mumbai Metro Stations
- List of Pune Metro stations
- List of Surat Metro stations
