= Sachivalaya metro station =

Lucknow Metro's Red Line metro station

Sachivalaya
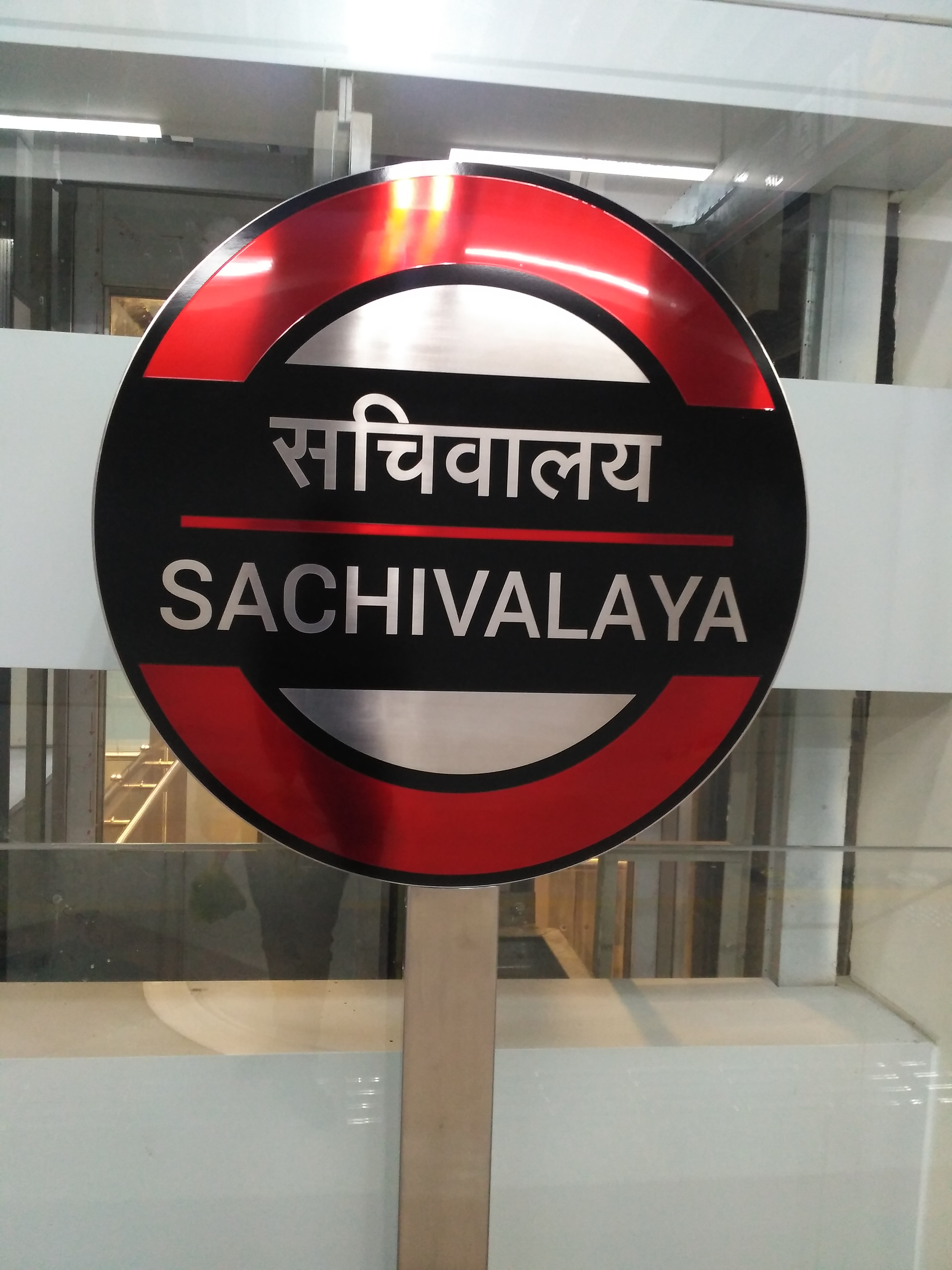

General information
- Location: Lalbagh, Lucknow, Uttar Pradesh 226001
- Coordinates: 26.842376°N 80.941155°E
- System: Lucknow Metro station
- Owner: Uttar Pradesh Metro Rail Corporation
- Operator: Uttar Pradesh Metro Rail Corporation
- Line: Red Line
- Platforms: Island platform Platform-1 → Munshi Pulia; Platform-2 → CCS International Airport
- Tracks: 2

Construction
- Structure type: Underground, Double track
- Platform levels: 2

History
- Opened: 8 March 2019; 7 years ago
- Electrified: Single-phase 25 kV 50 Hz AC through overhead catenary

Services
Preceding station	Lucknow Metro	Following station
Hussainganj towards CCS International Airport	Red Line	Hazratganj towards Munshi Pulia
Route map
Location

Sachivalaya is an underground metro station on the North-South Corridor of the Red Line of Lucknow Metro in Lucknow, Uttar Pradesh, India. It was opened to the public on 8 March 2019.

== Station layout ==
G	Street level	Exit / entrance
M	Mezzanine	Fare control, station agent, ticket/token, shops
P	Platform 2 Southbound	Towards → CCS International Airport; Next Station: Hussainganj
P	Island platform | Doors will open on the right
P	Platform 1 Northbound	Towards ← Munshi Pulia; Next Station: Hazratganj

== See also ==
- Lucknow
- List of Lucknow Metro stations
- Uttar Pradesh State Road Transport Corporation
- Rapid Transit in India
- List of metro systems
