= Sanjay Gupta (businessman) =

Indian businessman and civil servant (1963–2021)

- Born: Sanjay Raghunathprasad Gupta; 1963; Patna Bihar, India
- Died: 2021 (aged 57–58); Lucknow
- Occupation: Promoter of Neesa Group
- Website: sanjayrgupta.com

Sanjay Raghunathprasad Gupta (1963–26 April 2021) was an Indian businessman and civil servant. He was chairman and founder of Neesa Group of companies.

== Career ==
Sanjay Gupta is a civil engineer from Indian Institute of Technology, Roorkee and a diploma holder in finance from Institute of Chartered Financial Analysts of India (ICFAI University) and an Indian Administrative Service (IAS) officer working with the government of Gujarat for 17 years (1985 to 2002) in various departments at top level positions.

=== Government ===
Sanjay Gupta joined IAS at the age of 22 and started his career as Civil servant in Gujarat State.

Since then he has held top level positions in various departments of government of Gujarat.

Later, he was managing director of Gujarat State Petroleum Corporation between 1997 and 2002. While there, he helped set up a 160MW gas-based power plant, promoted the largest distributor of internet bandwidth in Gujarat, and launched a fuel consultancy business.

=== Private sector ===
He worked as chief executive officer for Adani Group from 2002 to 2005. In April 2011, he was appointed as executive chairman of the Rs 12,000-crore Metro-Link Express for Gandhinagar and Ahmedabad project, but resigned suddenly in August 2013.

Gupta announced plans in 2012 to launch a national news channel based in Gujarat.

== 2015 arrest ==
In May 2015, Gupta and several others were arrested for their alleged involvement in a Rs 113 crore fraud in the Metro-Link project. He was released on bail for health reasons in December 2015.
