= Thaltej metro station =

Ahmedabad Metro's Blue Line terminal metro station

Thaltej
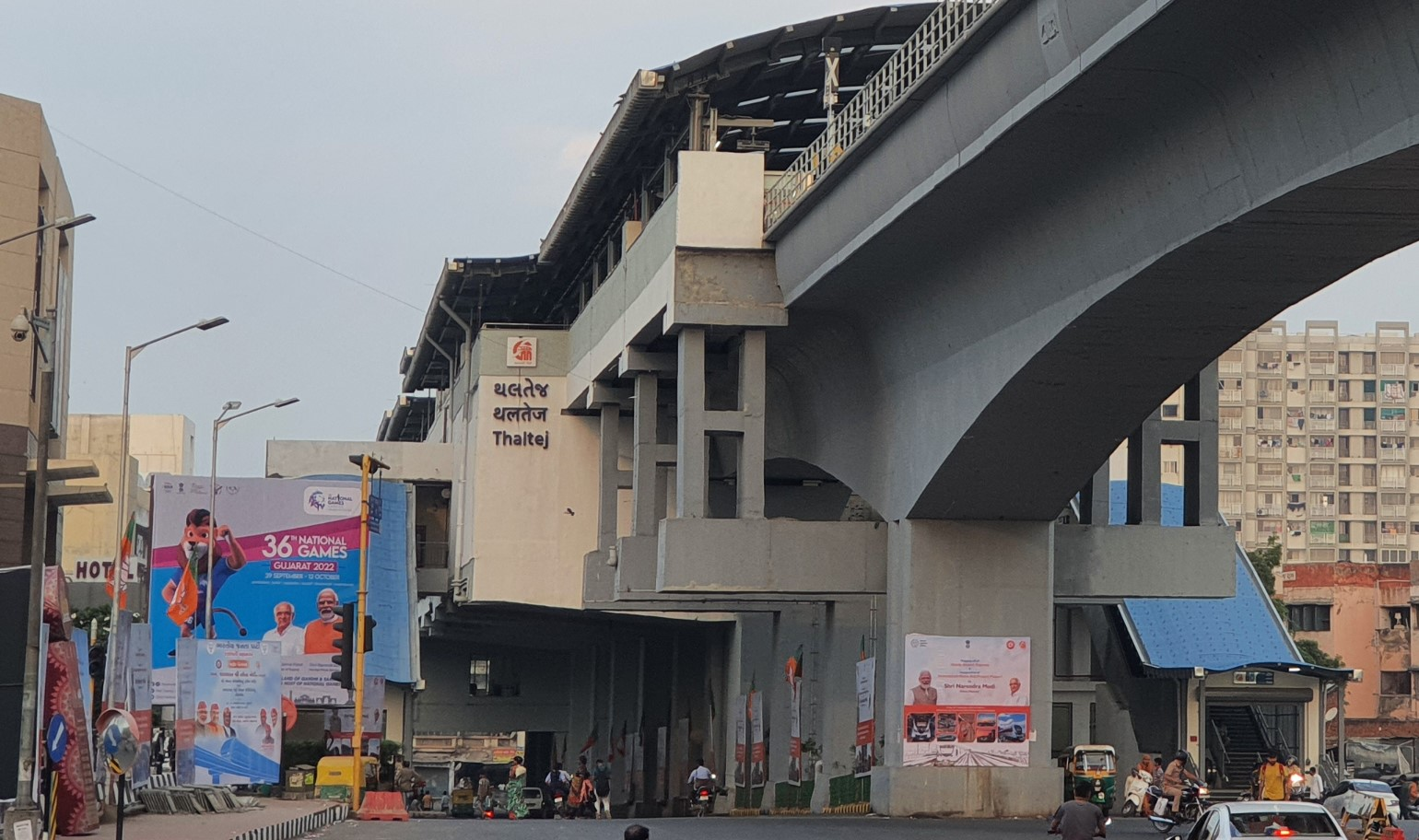

General information
- Location: Thaltej, Ahmedabad, Gujarat 380059
- Coordinates: 23°02′59″N 72°30′58″E
- System: Ahmedabad Metro station
- Owner: Gujarat Metro Rail Corporation Limited
- Operator: Ahmedabad Metro
- Line: Blue Line
- Platforms: 2
- Tracks: 2

Construction
- Structure type: Elevated, Double track
- Accessible: Yes

Other information
- Status: Operational

History
- Opening: 30 September 2022; 3 years ago

Services
Preceding station	Ahmedabad Metro	Following station
Thaltej Gam Terminus	Blue Line	Doordarshan Kendra towards Vastral Gam
Route map
Location

Thaltej is a metro station on the East-West Corridor of the Blue Line of Ahmedabad Metro in Ahmedabad, India. This metro station consists of PVR Acropolis (Ahmedabad) along with Mondeal Business Park in West Ahmedabad. This metro station was opened to the public on 30 September 2022.

== Station layout ==
G	Street level	Exit/Entrance
L1	Mezzanine	Fare control, station agent, Metro Card vending machines, crossover
L2	Side platform | Doors will open on the left
L2	Platform 1 Eastbound	Towards → Vastram Gam; Next Station: Doordarshan Kendra
L2	Platform 2 Westbound	Towards → Thaltej Gam; Next Station: Thaltej Gam
L2	Side platform | Doors will open on the left
L2

== See also ==
- Ahmedabad
- Gujarat
- List of Ahmedabad Metro stations
- Rapid transit in India
