= Vastral Gam metro station =

Ahmedabad Metro's Blue Line terminal metro station

Vastral Gam

General information
- Location: Vastral, Ahmedabad, Gujarat 382418
- Coordinates: 22.99724°N 72.66766°E
- System: Ahmedabad Metro station
- Owner: Gujarat Metro Rail Corporation Limited
- Operator: Ahmedabad Metro
- Line: Blue Line
- Platforms: Side platform Platform-1 → Train Terminates Here; Platform-2 → Thaltej
- Tracks: 2

Construction
- Structure type: Elevated, Double track
- Platform levels: 2
- Accessible: Yes

Other information
- Status: Operational

History
- Opening: 4 March 2019; 7 years ago
- Electrified: 750 V DC third rail

Services
Preceding station	Ahmedabad Metro	Following station
Nirant Cross Road towards Thaltej	Blue Line	Terminus
Route map
Location

Vastral Gam is the elevated western terminal metro station on the East-West Corridor of the Blue Line of Ahmedabad Metro in Ahmedabad, India. This metro station consists of the main Ring Road Metro Circle which leads towards the Diesel Loco Shed, Vatva in the south and towards Naroda, a town in Gujarat in the north. This metro station was opened to the public on 4 March 2019.

== Station layout ==
G	Street level	Exit/Entrance
L1	Mezzanine	Fare control, station agent, Metro Card vending machines, crossover
L2	Side platform | Doors will open on the left
L2	Platform 1 Eastbound	Towards → Train Terminates Here
L2	Platform 2 Westbound	Towards ← Thaltej; Next Station: Nirant Cross Road
L2	Side platform | Doors will open on the left
L2

== See also ==
- List of Ahmedabad Metro stations
- Rapid transit in India
