= Ahmedabad Metro =

Rapid transit system in Ahmedabad, Gandhinagar and GIFT City, Gujarat, India

Coordinates: 23°01′19″N 72°34′47″E

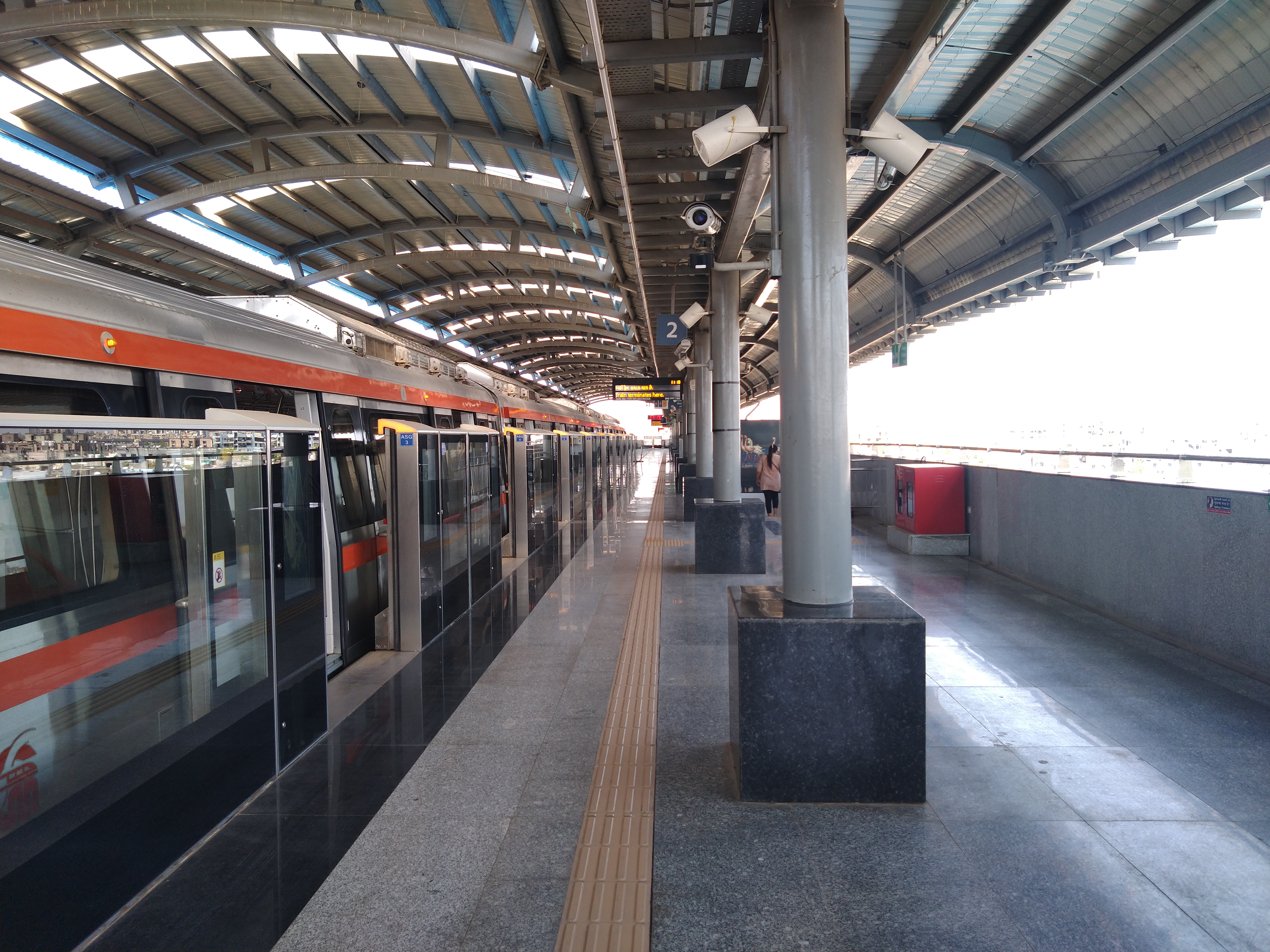
- A Red Line train of Ahmedabad Metro

Overview
- Native name: અમદાવાદ મેટ્રો
- Owner: Gujarat Metro Rail Corporation Limited
- Area served: Ahmedabad; Gandhinagar; GIFT City
- Transit type: Rapid transit
- Number of lines: 4
- Line number: Blue Line; Red Line; Violet Line; Yellow Line
- Number of stations: 53 (Note: Interchange stations are counted only once. There are 3 interchange stations. If added the number goes up to 56 stations)
- Annual ridership: 5.1 crore (51 million) (2025-26)
- Chief executive: Katikithala Srinivas (Chairman)
- Headquarters: Block No.1, First Floor, Karmayogi Bhavan, Sector 10/A, Gandhinagar-382010
- Website: Gujarat Metro

Operation
- Began operation: 4 March 2019; 7 years ago
- Operator: Gujarat Metro Rail Corporation Limited
- Character: Underground and elevated
- Rolling stock: Hyundai Rotem
- Train length: 3 coaches

Technical
- System length: 68.23 km (42.40 mi)
- No. of tracks: 2
- Track gauge: 1,435 mm (4 ft 8 1/2 in) standard gauge
- Electrification: 750 V DC Third rail
- Average speed: 33 km/h (21 mph)
- Top speed: 80 km/h (50 mph)
Route map
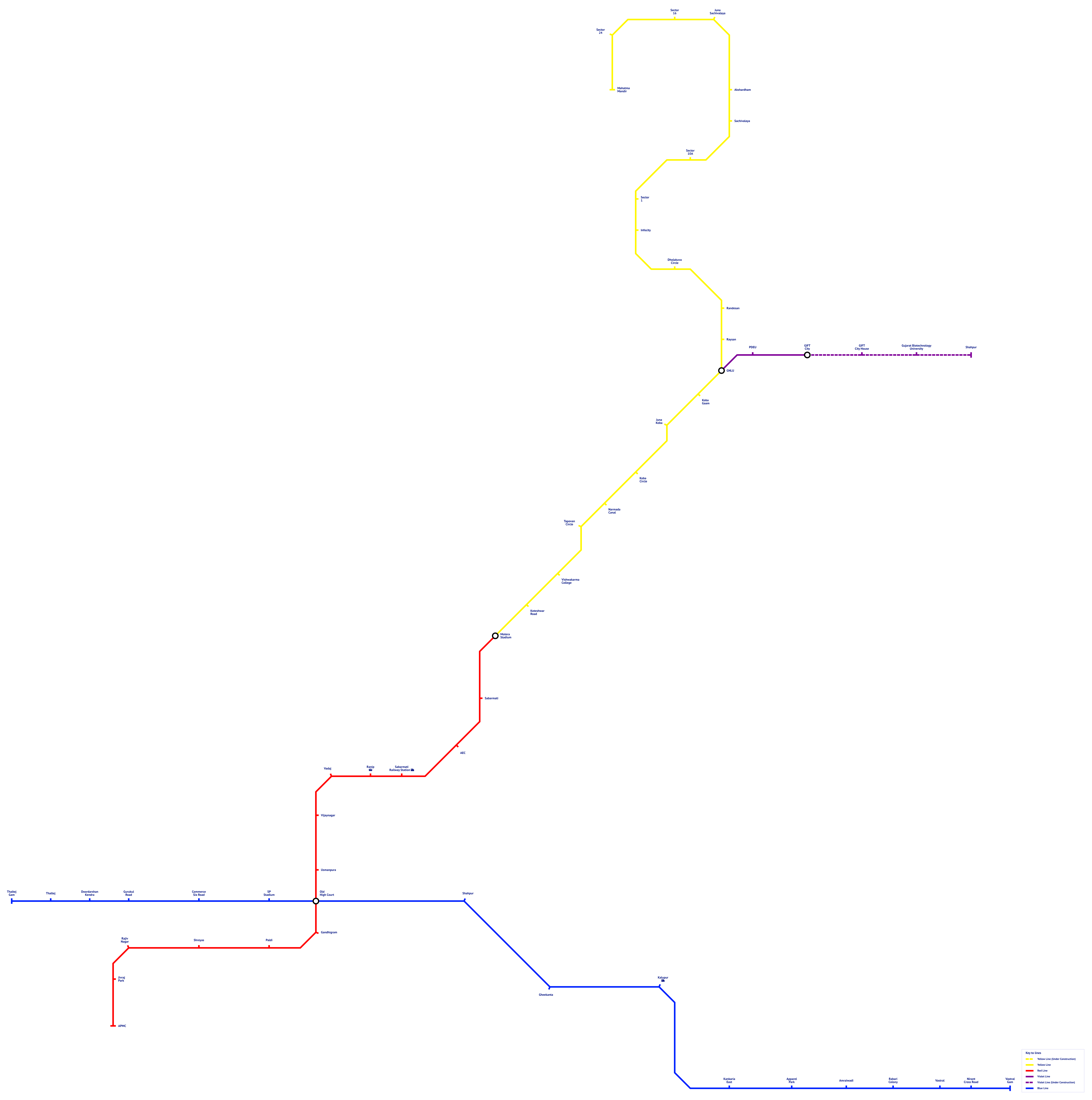

The Ahmedabad Metro is a rapid transit system for the cities of Ahmedabad, Gandhinagar, and GIFT City in the state of Gujarat in India. Currently the network is 68.23 km (42.396 mi) long and has 53 operational stations.

The Gujarat Metro Rail Corporation Limited was established in February 2010 and the 40.03 km (24.873 mi) Phase 1 of the project was approved in October 2013 with two corridors, North–South and East–West. Construction started on 14 March 2015. A 6.5 km (4.039 mi) section of the East–West corridor was inaugurated on 4 March 2019. The rest of Phase 1 was inaugurated on 30 September 2022, except the Thaltej Gam end and three stations. Phase 1 was completed in December 2024, except Sabarmati Railway Station metro station.

Phase 2 was approved in February 2019 and construction started in January 2021. The Violet Line and part of the Yellow line opened in September 2024. The rest of the Yellow Line opened gradually, concluding with the completion of Phase 2 in January 2026.

== Background ==
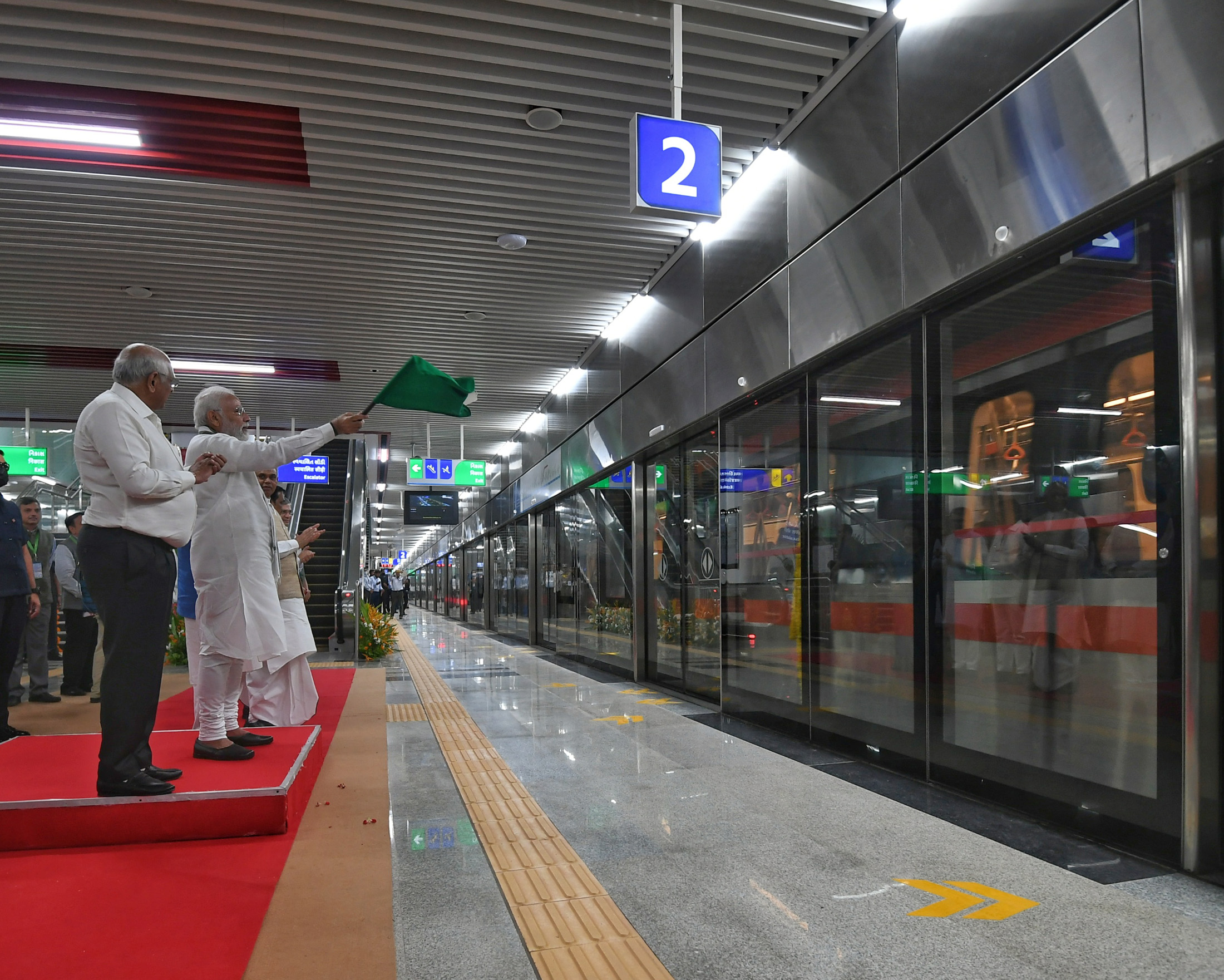
Prime Minister Narendra Modi inaugurating the metro on 30 September 2022.

In 2003, Gujarat Infrastructure Development Board carried out a study for urban transport between Gandhinagar and Ahmedabad. It also carried out the detailed project report through Delhi Metro Rail Corporation and RITES and submitted it in June 2005 and received Central Government's approval in the same year. Following the estimated cost of ₹4,295 crore (US$460 million) and the study of the viability of the project, it was abandoned in 2005 to give priority to the Ahmedabad BRTS and suburban railway projects. In 2008, considering the future developments in and around Ahmedabad and Gandhinagar, the project was revived and new corridors designed to make the project viable.

The special purpose vehicle company, Metro Link Express for Gandhinagar and Ahmedabad Company Ltd, later renamed Gujarat Metro Rail Corporation Limited (GMRC) in 2018, was established by Government of Gujarat on 4 February 2010 with ₹202 crore (US$22 million). Later in 2014, it was decided that the Central Government will own 50% of the company.

== Construction Phases ==
=== Phase 1 ===
The 40.03 km (24.873 mi) Phase 1 of the project was approved in October 2013 with two corridors, North–South and East–West. On 19 October 2014, Union Cabinet of India approved ₹10,773 crore (US$1.2 billion) for Phase 1. The Central Government approved the use of unused Western Railways land along the Botad-Sabarmati meter gauge line in November 2014. The original plan of Metro along Ashram Road was tweaked and the track was moved westward. The new plan added the cost of ₹600 crore (US$64 million) and two more stations. The new plan helped by causing fewer problems in land acquisition and less congestion on Ashram Road. In 2015 budget of Gujarat, ₹611 crore (US$65 million) was further allocated for the metro. The ground breaking ceremony was held on 14 March 2015 for the construction of the 6.5 km (4.039 mi) Vastral–Apparel Park stretch of the East–West corridor (Blue Line) in the presence of the then Gujarat Chief Minister, Anandiben Patel. The ground-breaking ceremony for the North–South Corridor (Red Line) was held on 17 January 2016 in the presence of the then Gujarat CM Anandiben Patel. The work started in March 2016. The Indian Railways permitted the construction of the North–South corridor stretch on its land in June 2016. The Japan International Cooperation Agency (JICA) agreed to fund ₹5,968 crore (US$640 million) for Phase 1 of the project in November 2015 and the first tranche of ₹4,456 crore (US$480 million) was released in 2016.

The trial runs were carried out in February 2019 on the 6.5 km (4.039 mi) Vastral–Apparel Park section of the Blue Line. The section was inaugurated on 4 March 2019 by Indian Prime Minister Narendra Modi. It was opened to the public on 6 March 2019. Except the Thaltej–Thaltej Gam section and three metro stations (Kankaria East, Thaltej Gam and Sabarmati Railway), the rest of Phase 1 was inaugurated on 30 September 2022 by Prime Minister Modi. The Blue and Red Lines were opened to the public on 2 October 2022 and 6 October 2022 respectively. The construction cost of Phase 1 was ₹12,900 crore (equivalent to ₹150 billion or US$1.6 billion in 2026). Kankaria East station was opened on 5 March 2024. Thaltej Gam station and the adjoining 1.4 km (0.870 mi) section of the Blue Line leading to Thaltej station were opened on 8 December 2024.

Phase 1
#	Line Name	Terminals		Stations	Length	Opening Date
1	Blue Line	Vastral Gam	Apparel Park	6	6.5 km	4 March 2019
1	Blue Line	Apparel Park	Thaltej	11	13.26 km	30 September 2022
1	Blue Line	Thaltej	Thaltej Gam	1	1.4 km	8 December 2024
2	Red Line	APMC	Motera Stadium	14	18.87 km	30 September 2022
Total				32	40.03 km	

=== Phase 2 ===
The Government of Gujarat approved Phase 2 in October 2017 and revised it in October 2018. In February 2019, the Union cabinet approved a cost of ₹5,384.17 crore (US$580 million) for Phase 2. Corridor 1 (Yellow Line) from Motera in Ahmedabad to Mahatma Mandir in Gandhinagar (23.838 km (14.812 mi)) with a branching Corridor 2 (Violet Line) from Gujarat National Law University (GNLU) linking Pandit Deendayal Energy University (PDEU) and GIFT City (5.416 km (3.365 mi)) was finalised. Phase 2 included a 28.26 km (17.560 mi) long elevated corridor with 22 stations.

The tendering for Phase 2 began in January 2020. On 18 January 2021, the foundation stone of Phase 2 was laid by Prime Minister Modi. In February 2023, Titagarh Rail Systems won a contract worth ₹350 crore (US$37 million) for providing rolling stock for Phase 2.

The trial run of Phase 2 started in February 2024 between GNLU and Dholakuva Circle stations. The Yellow Line connecting Sector-1 station of Gandhinagar with the Red Line and the branch Violet Line along with eight stations were inaugurated on 16 September 2024 by Prime Minister Modi. Seven new stations on the Yellow Line were opened to the public on 27 April 2025. Juna Koba and Koba Gaam stations on the Yellow Line were opened on 28 September 2025. The final 5.36-kilometre corridor of the Yellow Line, from Sachivalaya (Secretariat) to Mahatma Mandir, was inaugurated on 11 January 2026 by Prime Minister Modi. The total cost for Phase 2 was ₹5,384.17 crore (equivalent to ₹57 billion or US$610 million in 2026).

Under Phase 2A, GMRC planned to link the metro system to Sardar Vallabhbhai Patel International Airport in Ahmedabad at a cost of ₹1,800 crore (US$190 million). The Union Cabinet approved the plan in June 2026. The estimated cost of Phase 2A was ₹2,169.04 crore (US$230 million). The 6.032 km (3.748 mi) Airport Line corridor will branches off from Yellow Line with Koteshwar Road station as an interchange. The corridor will be elevated from Koteshwar Road to the Taj Hotel Circle, and from there to the airport it will be underground. It will have 5 metro stations including an underground station at the airport. The approved stations are Ashram Road, Koteshwar Prachin Mandir, Sabarmati River, Sardar Nagar and Airport.

In April 2026, under Phase 2B, the GMRC invited the bids for extension of the Violet Line from GIFT City to Shahpur Circle with a 3.33 km elevated corridor and 3 stations, at a cost of ₹290.33 crore (equivalent to ₹300 crore or US$32 million in 2026). The approved stations are GIFT City House, Gujarat Biotechnology University and Shahpur.

Phase 2
No.	Line Name	Terminals		Stations	Length	Opening Date
3	Yellow Line	Motera Stadium	Sector-1	14	15.40 km	16 September 2024
3	Yellow Line	Sector-1	Mahatma Mandir	7	7.44 km	11 January 2026
4	Violet Line	GNLU	GIFT City	3	5.42 km	16 September 2024
4	Violet Line	GIFT City	Shahpur Circle	3	3.33 km	Approved
5	Pink Line	Koteshwar Road	SVPI Airport	5	6.032 km	Approved
Total				32	37.622 km	

=== Phase 3 ===
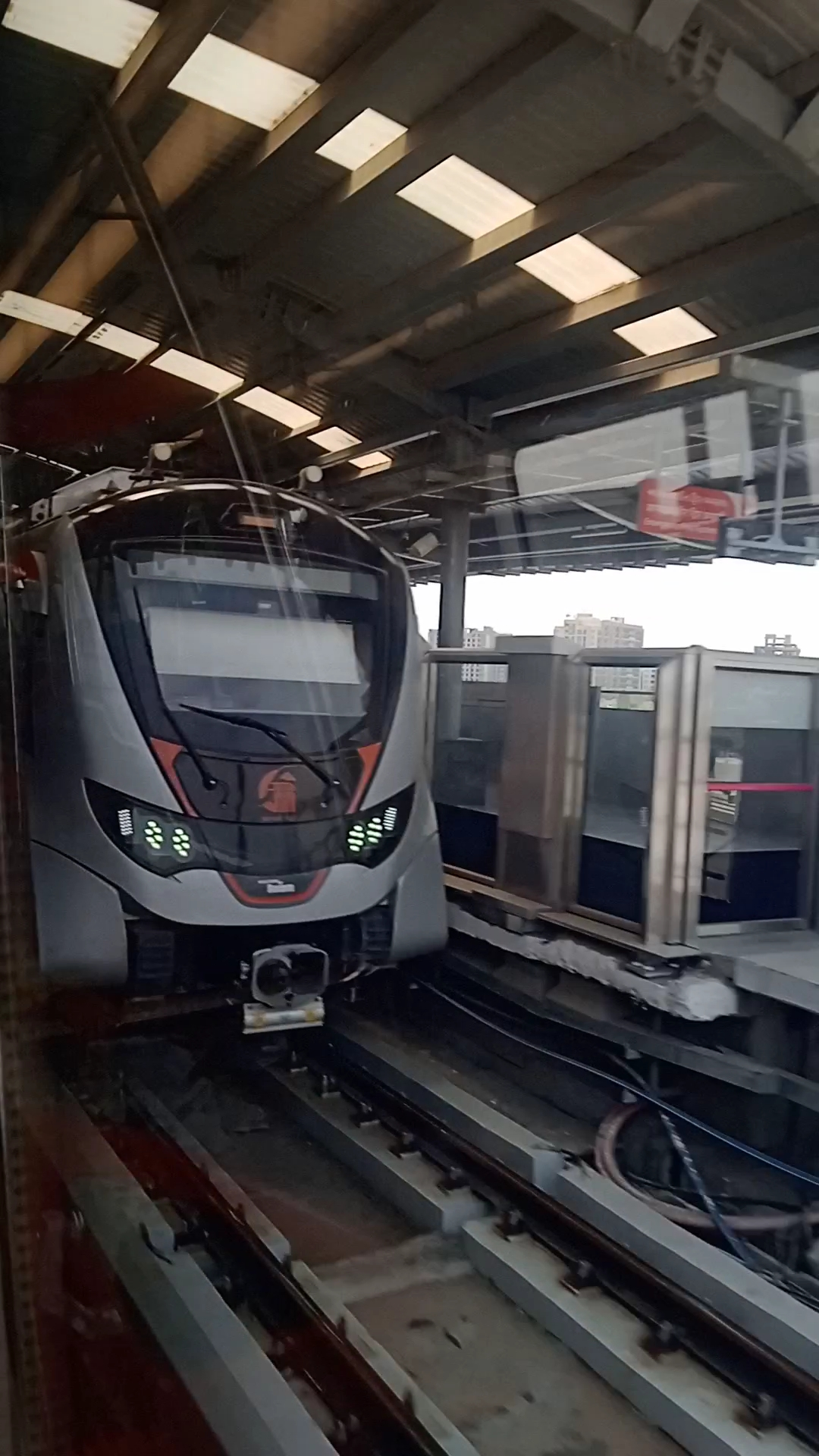
Hyundai rotem rolling stock of Ahmedabad metro

Under Phase 3A, the Blue Line will be extended from Thaltej Gam to Godhavi with two distinct elevated corridors totalling 10.8 km (6.7 mi) with nine stations: a 3.313 km Thaltej Gam to Canal Road Metro Station corridor with three elevated stations, and a 7.505 km Canal Road Metro Station to Godhavi Metro-cum-Rapid Rail Transit System hybrid corridor with six stations. This extension will connect to upcoming SWASA (South West Ahmedabad Sports Arena) and further to Sanand.

In August 2026, the Public Investment Board approved the Phase 3. The detailed designing is underway. The approval of Union cabinet is pending.

Phase 3
No.	Line Name	Terminals		Stations	Length	Opening Date
1	Blue Line	Godhavi	Canal Road	6	7.505 km	Planned
1	Blue Line	Canal Road	Thaltej Gam	2	3.313 km	Planned
2	Blue Line Branch	Shilaj Circle	Badrabad (Daskroi)	7	12.53	Proposed
3	Circular Line	APMC	New Faisalnagar (Danilimda)	5	6.56	Proposed
3	Circular Line	Vishalnagar West	Bapunagar North	10	11.04	Proposed
3	Circular Line	Naranpura	Nehrunagar	5	8.68	Proposed
3	Circular Line	Veer Savarkar Sports Complex	Arihantnagar	5	4.84	Proposed
3	Circular Line	Dudheshwar	Vadaj	3	4.62	Proposed
Total				43	58.53 km	

=== Proposed expansions ===
The GMRC also submitted a proposal to the Ministry of Housing and Urban Affairs to extend the Violet Line to construct a 6 to 10 km (3.7 to 6.2 mi) elevated circular loop within GIFT City. The estimated cost for the construction is ₹2,000 crore (US$210 million). The project is expected to add four to six metro stations to connect the different campuses within the city. Another proposal includes extension of Violet Line to IIT Gandhinagar. This 7 km (4.3 mi) route will have six stations and will cost around ₹1,750 crore (US$190 million).

Other proposals under study include Thaltej Gam–Sanathal route, RTO–Jivraj–Narol–Naroda route, and the Paldi–Apparel Park route.

=== Construction contracts ===
Sl No.	Contract	Contractor
1	General Consultancy	Systra-RITES-Oriental-AECOM JV
2	96 coaches (Rolling stock)	Hyundai Rotem
3	Signalling System	Nippon Signal Co. Ltd, Japan
4	Apparel Park Depot	URC Construction
5	Gyaspur Depot	Gannon Dunkerly - PSPO JV
6	Vastral Gam - Apparel Park (Viaduct - 6 km)	J Kumar Infraprojects
7	Vastral Gam - Apparel Park (6 Stations)	DRA Infracon - CICO JV
8	East Ramp - Kalupur (Tunnels & 2 Stations - 2.45 km)	Afcons Infrastructure
9	Kalupur - West Ramp (Tunnels & 2 Stations - 4.38 km)	Larsen & Toubro
10	Thaltej Gam - West Ramp (Viaduct & 7 Stations - 8.21 km)	Tata Projects - CRCC JV
11	Gyspur - Shreyas (Viaduct & 4 Stations - 4.62 km)	
12	Shreyas - Ranip (Viaduct & 6 Stations -8.94 km)	Simplex Infrastructure
13	Motera - Ranip (Viaduct - 4.85 km)	Ranjit Buildcon
14	Motera - Ranip (5 Stations)	Pratibha - Ranjit JV
15	Shreyas to Ranip (Viaduct & 6 stations – 8.94 km)	Simplex Infrastructure
16	Kalupur to West Ramp (Tunnels & 2 stations – 4.38 km)	Larsen & Toubro
17	Thaltej Gam to West Ramp (Viaduct, Sabarmati Bridge & 7 stations – 8.21 km)	Tata – CCECC JV
18	Electrification	Siemens India - Siemens AG, Germany
19	Automatic Fare Collection System	Nippon Signal Co. Ltd, Japan
20	Telecommunication System	M/s. L&T Limited

== Lines ==
=== Blue Line ===
The Blue Line forms the east–west corridor of the Ahmedabad Metro, connecting Vastral Gam with Thaltej Gam. It covers approximately 21.23 kilometres and serves 18 stations, including four underground stations. Its first section, between Vastral Gam and Apparel Park, was inaugurated on 4 March 2019. Most of the remaining corridor opened to the public on 2 October 2022, while the extension to Thaltej Gam opened on 8 December 2024. The line provides an interchange with the Red Line at Old High Court station.

=== Red Line ===
The Red Line forms the north–south corridor of the Ahmedabad Metro, connecting APMC with Motera Stadium. The entirely elevated route is approximately 18.87 kilometres long and has 15 stations, of which 14 are operational. It was inaugurated on 30 September 2022 and opened to the public on 6 October 2022. The line provides interchanges with the Blue Line at Old High Court station and the Yellow Line at Motera Stadium.

=== Yellow Line ===
The Yellow Line extends the Ahmedabad Metro network from Motera Stadium to Mahatma Mandir in Gandhinagar. The entirely elevated corridor covers approximately 23.84 kilometres and serves 21 stations, connecting with the Red Line at Motera Stadium and the Violet Line at GNLU. Its first section opened to the public on 17 September 2024, with additional stations introduced in stages during 2025. The final section, between Sachivalaya and Mahatma Mandir, was inaugurated on 11 January 2026.

=== Violet Line ===
The Violet Line is an elevated branch of the Ahmedabad Metro connecting Gujarat National Law University (GNLU) with GIFT City via Pandit Deendayal Energy University (PDEU). Built under Phase 2, the approximately 5.42-kilometre route serves three stations and connects with the Yellow Line at GNLU. It was inaugurated on 16 September 2024 and opened to the public on 17 September 2024.

== Network ==
Ahmedabad Metro
Line Name	First Operation	Last Extension	Stations	Length	Terminals		Rolling Stock	Track Gauge (mm)	Electrification	End to end travel time
Blue Line	4 March 2019	8 December 2024	18	21.16 km (13.15 mi)	Vastral Gam	Thaltej Gam	Hyundai Rotem	Standard Gauge (1,435 mm)	750V DC Third Rail	45 min
Red Line	30 September 2022		14	18.87 km (11.73 mi)	APMC	Motera Stadium	Hyundai Rotem	Standard Gauge (1,435 mm)	750V DC Third Rail	67 min
Yellow Line	16 September 2024	11 January 2026	21	22.8 km (14.2 mi)	Motera Stadium	Mahatma Mandir	Hyundai Rotem	Standard Gauge (1,435 mm)	750V DC Third Rail	
Violet Line	16 September 2024		3	5.4 km (3.4 mi)	GNLU	GIFT City	Hyundai Rotem	Standard Gauge (1,435 mm)	750V DC Third Rail	
Total			53	68.23 km (42.40 mi)						

== Operations ==
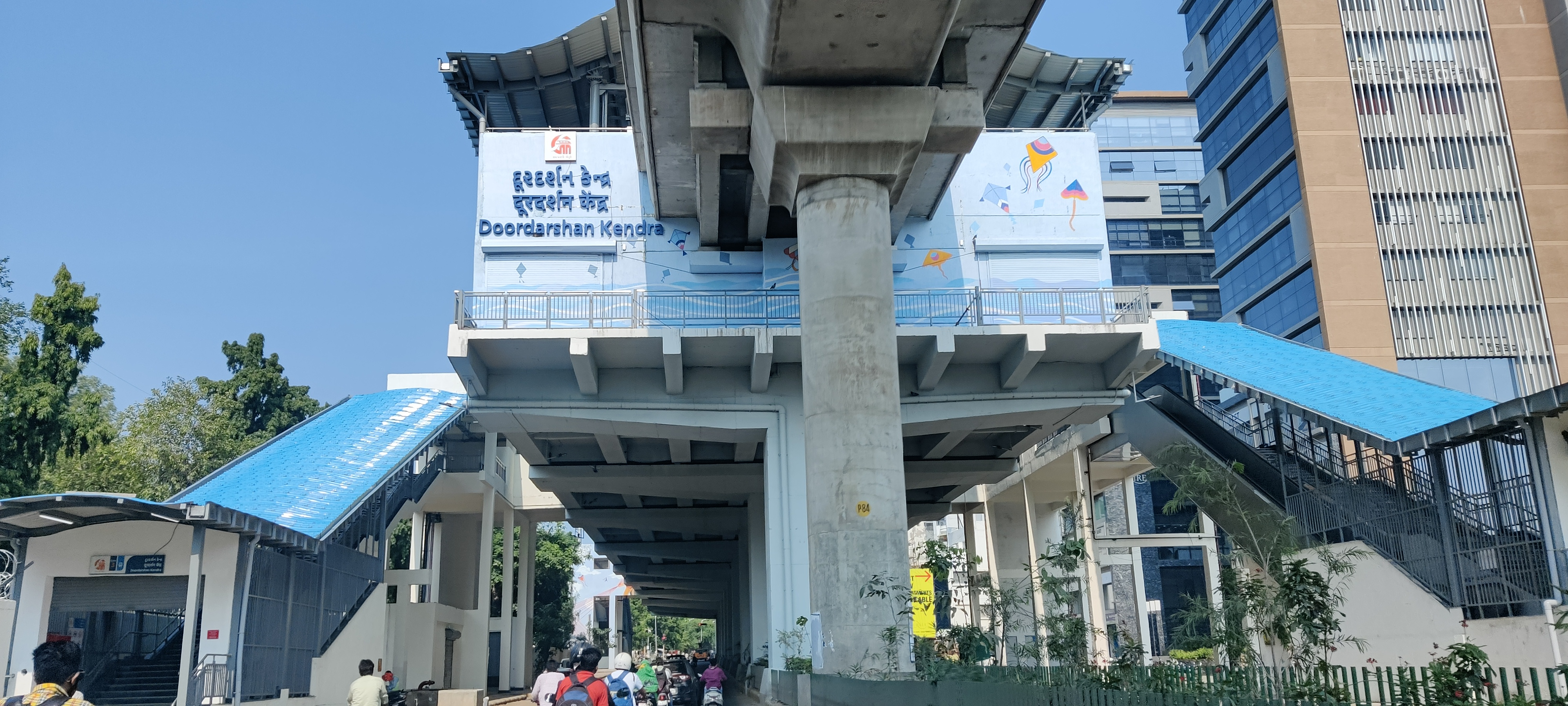
Doordarshan Kendra metro station

The metro started commercial operations in March 2019. Over 7.1 lakh people had travelled by metro till June 2022 but the monthly ridership had never exceeded 38,137 which is the highest ridership registered in March 2019 due to short length of the opened corridor then. The most riders were identified as those taking joyrides.

Following opening of the Phase-1 in September 2022, the ridership increased significantly. In FY 2025-26 (April 2025 to March 2026) more than 5,10,29,000 people travelled via metro with average daily ridership of 1,53,871 in January 2026.

Yearly ridership
Year	Ridership
March 2019	38,137
2019–20	284,934
2020–21	46,570
2021–22	241,694
October 2022–23	734,363
2023–24	29,346,000
2024–25	40,068,000
2025–26	51,029,000

== Controversy ==
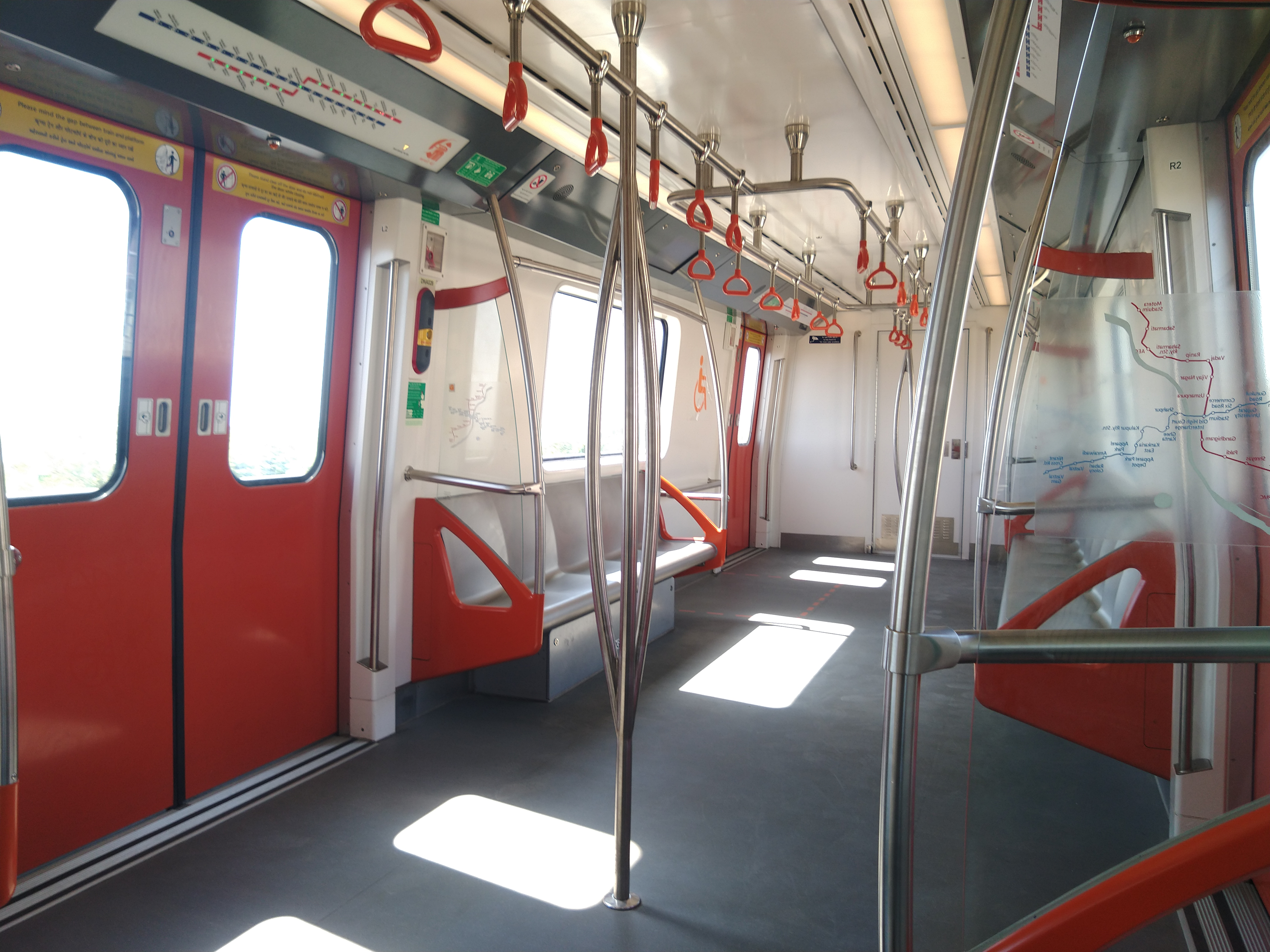
Ahmedabad Metro Red Line Interior

Near Thaltej Gam on western side, 300-odd shop owners opposed the land acquisition while the officials said that there is need of huge land for depot and parking for the project. The land acquisition is also opposed by the residents and shop owners of Jivraj Park in Vejalpur area. They had filed a case in Gujarat High Court. They settled the case in September 2017. Former IAS officer and executive chairman of project Sanjay Gupta and seven of his subordinate officers were accused while two of them were arrested in May 2015 for alleged committed fraud of ₹113 crore (US$12 million) in procurement and use of ground filling materials for the project in 2012. Another case regarding procurement of 603 tons of TMT steel worth ₹2.62 crore (US$280,000) which was never delivered is also being investigated.

The Comptroller and Auditor General has pointed out wasteful expenditure of ₹373.62 crore (US$40 million) on earlier unapproved corridors.

== See also ==
- List of Ahmedabad Metro stations
- Urban rail transit in India
  - Gujarat Metro Rail Corporation Limited
    - Rajkot Metro
    - Surat Metro
    - Vadodara Metro
