= Gujarat Metro Rail Corporation Limited =

Metro rail corporation in Gujarat, India

Gujarat Metro Rail Corporation Limited (GMRC)
- Type: Public sector company
- Industry: Public transport
- Predecessor: Metrolink Express for Gandhinagar and Ahmedabad (MEGA)
- Founded: 4 February 2010; 16 years ago
- Headquarters: 1st Floor, Block - 1, Karmayogi Bhavan, Sector 10A, Sector 10, Gandhinagar, Gujarat, India
- Area served: Gujarat
- Key people: Shri S. S. Rathore (MD)
- Services: Ahmedabad Metro; Surat Metro
- Revenue: ₹14,867.23 lakh (US$15 million) (2022-23)
- Owners: Govt of India (50%); Govt of Gujarat (50%)
- Website: GMRC

Gujarat Metro Rail Corporation Limited (GMRC) is a joint venture company of the Government of India and Government of Gujarat. It was established on February 4, 2010, with an initial investment of ₹202 crore (approximately US$25 million). The company is headquartered in Gandhinagar, Gujarat, India. GMRCL previously known as Metro-Link Express for Gandhinagar and Ahmedabad (MEGA).

== Systems ==
=== Operational Systems ===
As of 11 October 2026

List of current operational systems in Gujarat
System	Locale	Lines operational	Stations	Length		Opened	Annual ridership (in millions)
System	Locale	Lines operational	Stations	Operational	Under construction	Opened	Annual ridership (in millions)
Ahmedabad Metro	Ahmedabad, Gandhinagar, GIFT City	4	54	67.56 km	—N/a	4 March 2019	51.03 (2025) (Note: Total ridership figures based on the fiscal year from April 2025 to March 2026.)
Total		4	54	67.56 km		—N/a	51.03 million

=== Systems in development ===
As of 6 October 2026

Under construction
Centre approved DPR
Central DPR appraisal
Centre rejected DPR
State approved DPR
DPR submitted
DPR under preparation
On hold

System	Locale	Length		Construction began	Planned opening
System	Locale	Under construction	Planned	Construction began	Planned opening
Surat Metro	Surat	41.93 km		2021	2027
Rajkot Metro	Rajkot		38 km	TBD	TBD
Vadodara Metro	Vadodara		40 km	TBD	TBD
Total		41.93 km	78 km		
