= Green Line (The Vine) =

Bus rapid transit service in Vancouver, Washington

The Vine on Fourth Plain
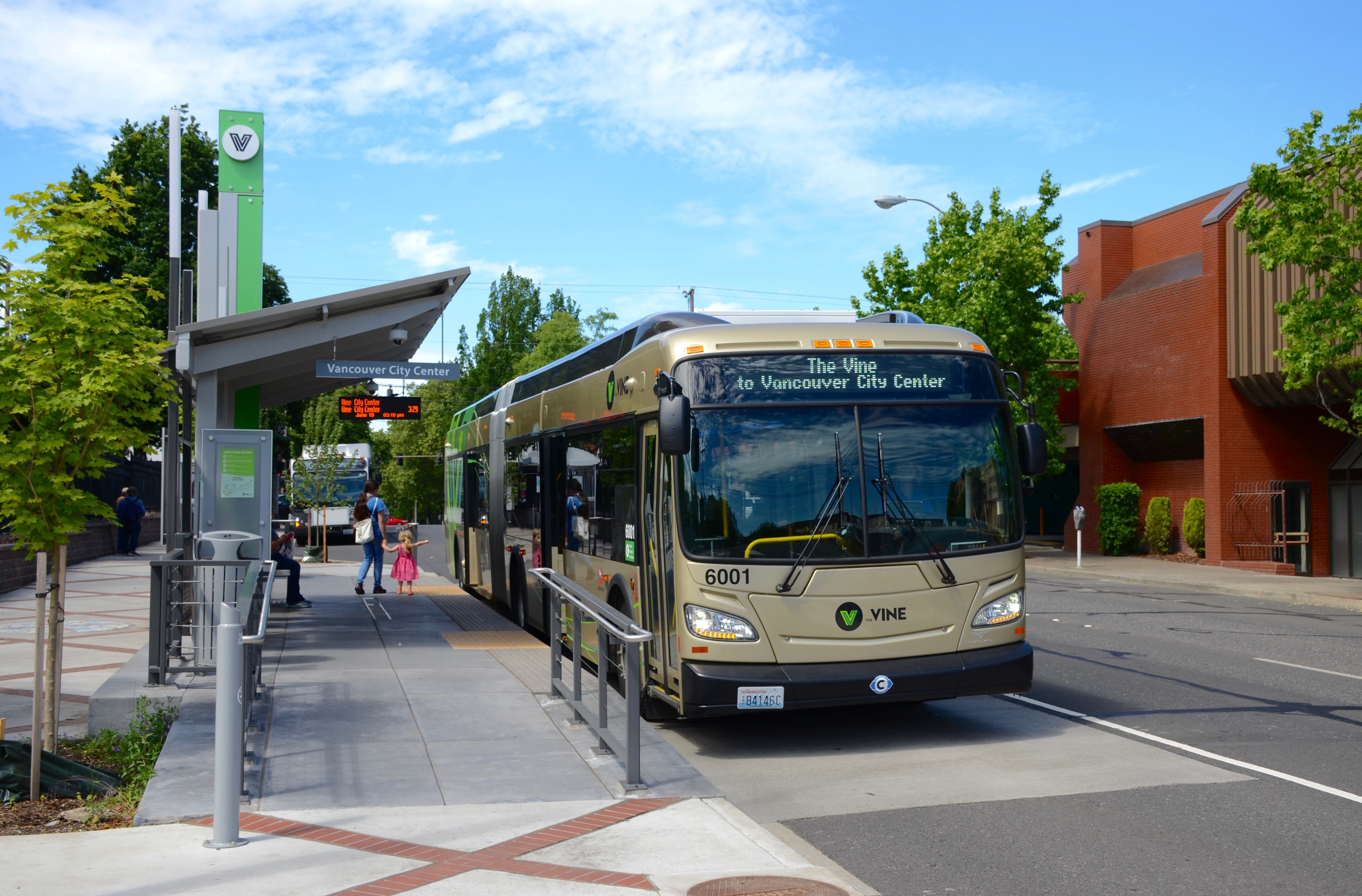
- A Vine bus at the Washington & 12th station in downtown Vancouver in 2017

Overview
- Operator: C-Tran
- Vehicle: New Flyer Xcelsior XDE60
- Began service: January 8, 2017
- Predecessors: C-Tran routes 4 and 44

Route
- Route type: Bus rapid transit
- Locale: Vancouver, Washington
- Start: Downtown Vancouver
- Via: Fort Vancouver Way, Fourth Plain Boulevard
- End: Vancouver Mall Transit Center
- Length: 6.7 mi (10.8 km)
- Stations: 34

Service
- Frequency: 10 minutes
- Weekend frequency: 15 minutes
- Journey time: 30 minutes
- Operates: Weekdays: 4:30 am–1:06 am Weekends: 6:00 am–12:51 am
- Annual patronage: 1,125,663 (2025)
- Timetable: The Vine map and schedule

The Green Line, also known as The Vine on Fourth Plain, is a bus rapid transit (BRT) route in Vancouver, Washington, that is operated by C-Tran as part of The Vine system. The 6-mile-long (9.7 km) line runs from downtown Vancouver to the Vancouver Mall, serving 34 stations primarily on Fourth Plain Boulevard. It opened on January 8, 2017, becoming the first bus rapid transit line in the Portland metropolitan area.

The corridor was identified as a possible BRT route in 2005 and was originally named the Fourth Plain BRT Project. The routing was approved for BRT development in 2012 by C-Tran, the Vancouver City Council, and the Federal Transit Administration and construction began in August 2015. The $53 million project is primarily funded by a Federal Transit Administration grant that was secured in late 2015. The Vine replaced two bus routes that carried over 6,000 trips daily. A second line in The Vine system, the Red Line on Mill Plain Boulevard, opened on October 1, 2023.

== History ==
The Southwest Washington Regional Transportation Council (RTC) began studying high-capacity transit for Vancouver and Clark County in 2008, and determined that bus rapid transit would be viable on four main corridors: Highway 99, Fourth Plain Boulevard, Interstate 205, and Mill Plain Boulevard. C-Tran, the county's transit agency, adopted a 20-year long-range plan in 2010 that recommended building the first bus rapid transit line on Fourth Plain. The Fourth Plain corridor had been served by local routes 4 and 44, the two busiest in the C-Tran system, which continued to northern Portland, Oregon.

Design concepts for a Fourth Plain bus rapid transit service were presented in 2011 and 2012, and a locally-preferred alternative was adopted by C-Tran, the Vancouver City Council, and RTC in 2012.

On November 6, 2012, C-Tran placed a 0.1 percent sales tax increase on the general election ballot to fund a light rail extension from Portland to Downtown Vancouver via a new bridge, as well as operating costs of the Fourth Plain bus rapid transit project. While the ballot measure was rejected, the bus rapid transit project moved forward and was granted Federal Transit Administration (FTA) funding in 2014. Opponents of the project filed a lawsuit in the Clark County Superior Court in 2014 to prevent C-Tran from receiving federal funds, arguing that the project did not meet the definition of "high-capacity transit" as required in the ballot measure language. The suit was dismissed in 2015, with the judge ruling in favor of C-Tran.

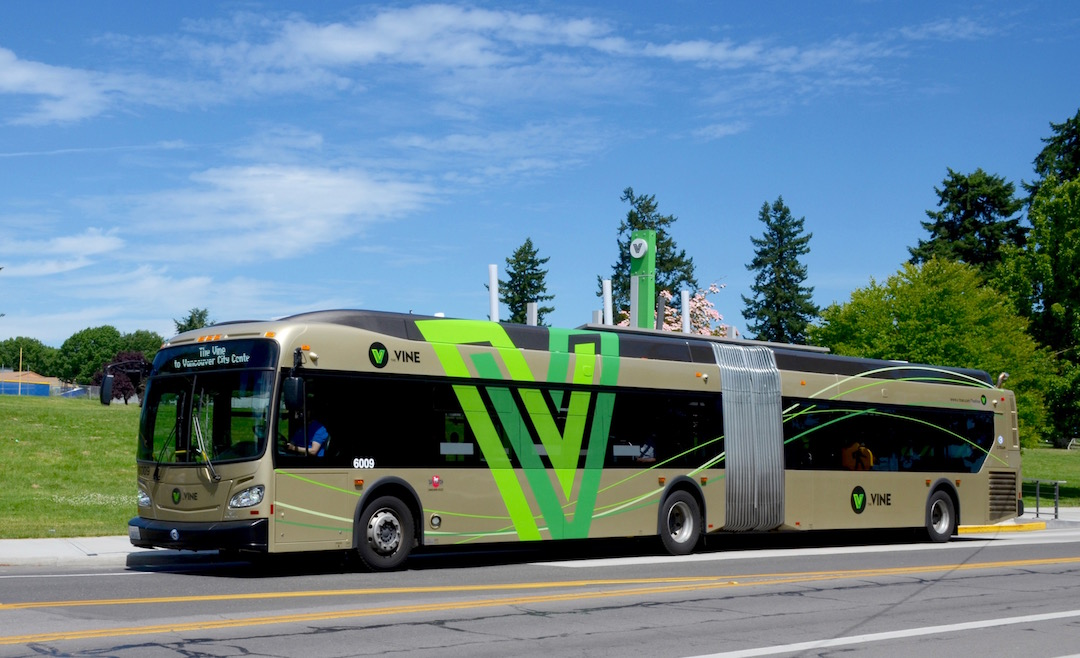
The paint scheme used exclusively for the Vine buses features the large V logo and thin, vine-like wavy lines.

The project was named "The Vine" after a public naming contest in 2014, beating out other candidates by "evoking greenery, leaves and branches". A groundbreaking ceremony was held on August 24, 2015, kicking off construction of the $53 million project. The FTA confirmed its $38.5 million commitment to the project in September; the rest of the project is funded by C-Tran, and grants from the Washington State Department of Transportation and RTC.

In October 2016, C-Tran announced that The Vine would open on January 8, 2017. C-Tran held a community celebration on January 7, 2017, including a street fair and preview rides attended by 200 people. Service began on January 8, 2017, using 40-foot (12 m) buses in place of the service's articulated buses, and stopping at route 4 stops rather than stations, due to a winter storm. The articulated buses, which lack drop-down tire chains that would allow for operations in winter conditions, debuted the following day instead. In its first year of service, The Vine carried 45 percent more riders than Route 4 and operating costs decreased by 21 percent.

The Vine was the first bus rapid transit system to open in the Portland metropolitan area, and was followed in 2022 by the Frequent Express service between Portland and Gresham. In February 2018, the C-Tran Board of Directors approved a design contract for a potential bus rapid transit project on Mill Plain Boulevard, an east–west corridor to the south of The Vine's Fourth Plain Boulevard. Project construction on the Red Line began in September 2021 and the line is scheduled to begin service on October 1, 2023. As a result, the original line was renamed to the Green Line.

=== Planned extension ===
The Green Line is also planned to be extended east into Orchards and south along Northeast 162nd Avenue to Fisher's Landing Transit Center, a major regional hub near the Columbia River, by 2026.

== Route ==
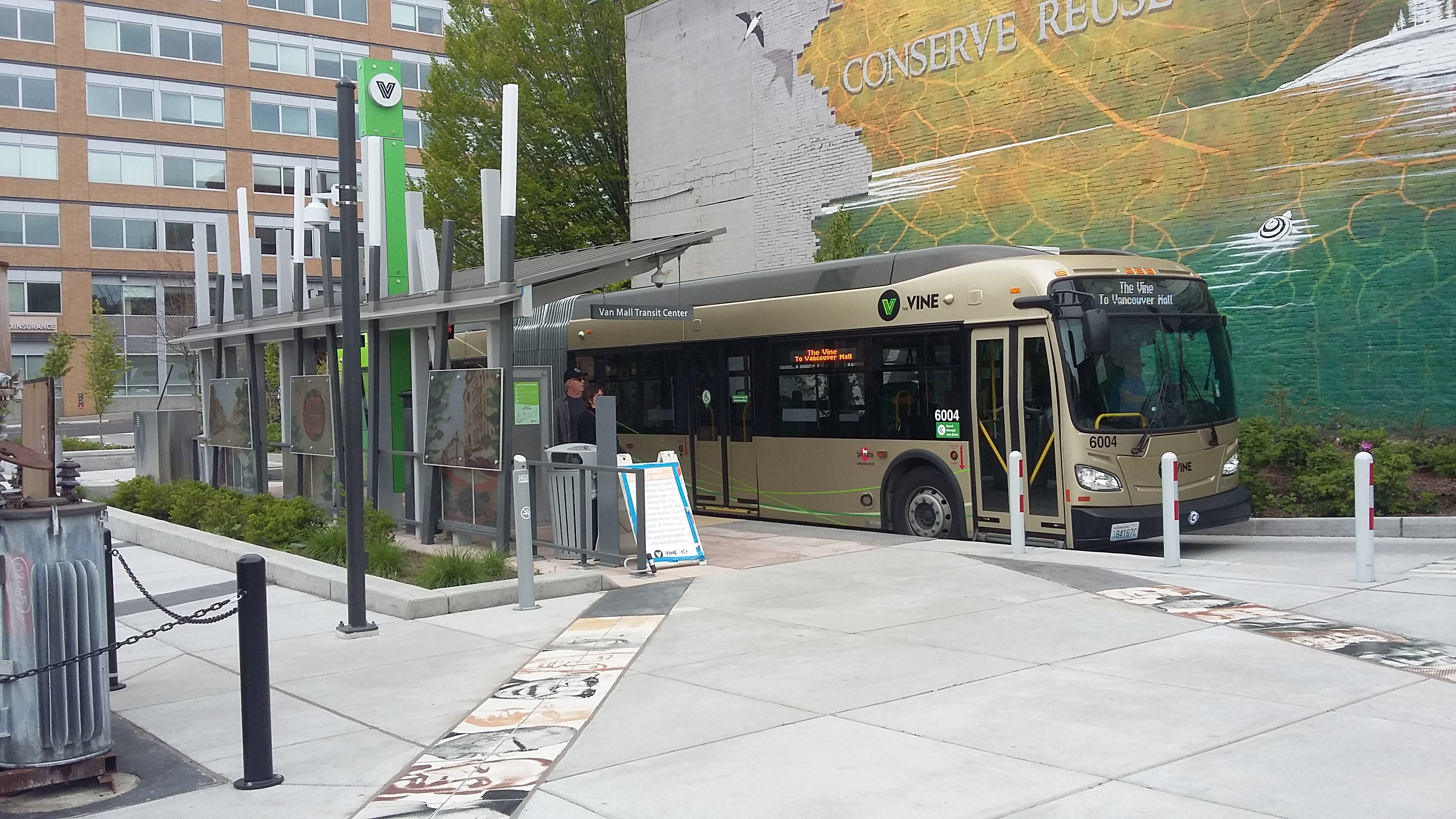
7th Street at Turtle Place station

The Vine's Green Line begins at Turtle Place, a former park that was once home to a C-Tran bus station, located on 7th Street between Washington and Main streets in downtown Vancouver and one block east of Esther Short Park. Within downtown Vancouver, buses travel in a one-way pair, southbound on Washington Street and northbound on Broadway Street, before turning east onto McLoughlin Boulevard and crossing under Interstate 5. The Green Line then stops at the Marshall/Luepke Community Center on the east side of the freeway and turns onto Fort Vancouver Way, heading northeast to serve the campus of Clark College with two stops as well as the Vancouver campus of the VA Medical Center. The route turns eastward once again at Fourth Plain Boulevard, following the corridor as it parallels the State Route 500 freeway to the north. At Thurston Way, the Green Line turns north towards its final approach to the Vancouver Mall, where the line terminates.

Along the route, the Green Line has several queue jumps installed to give buses priority at traffic signals.

=== Stations ===
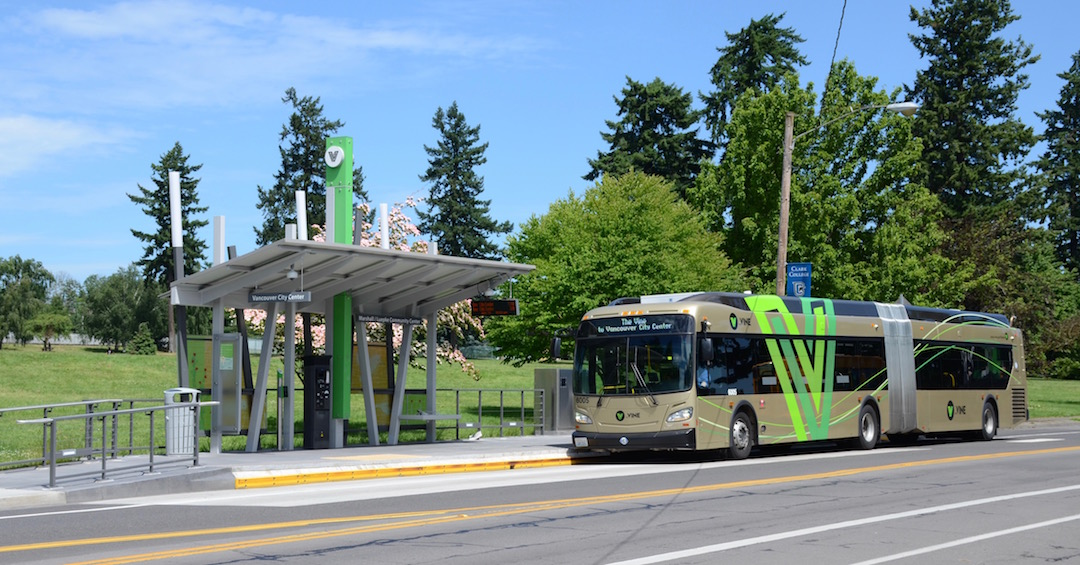
A Vine bus pulling into the Marshall Community Center station in 2017

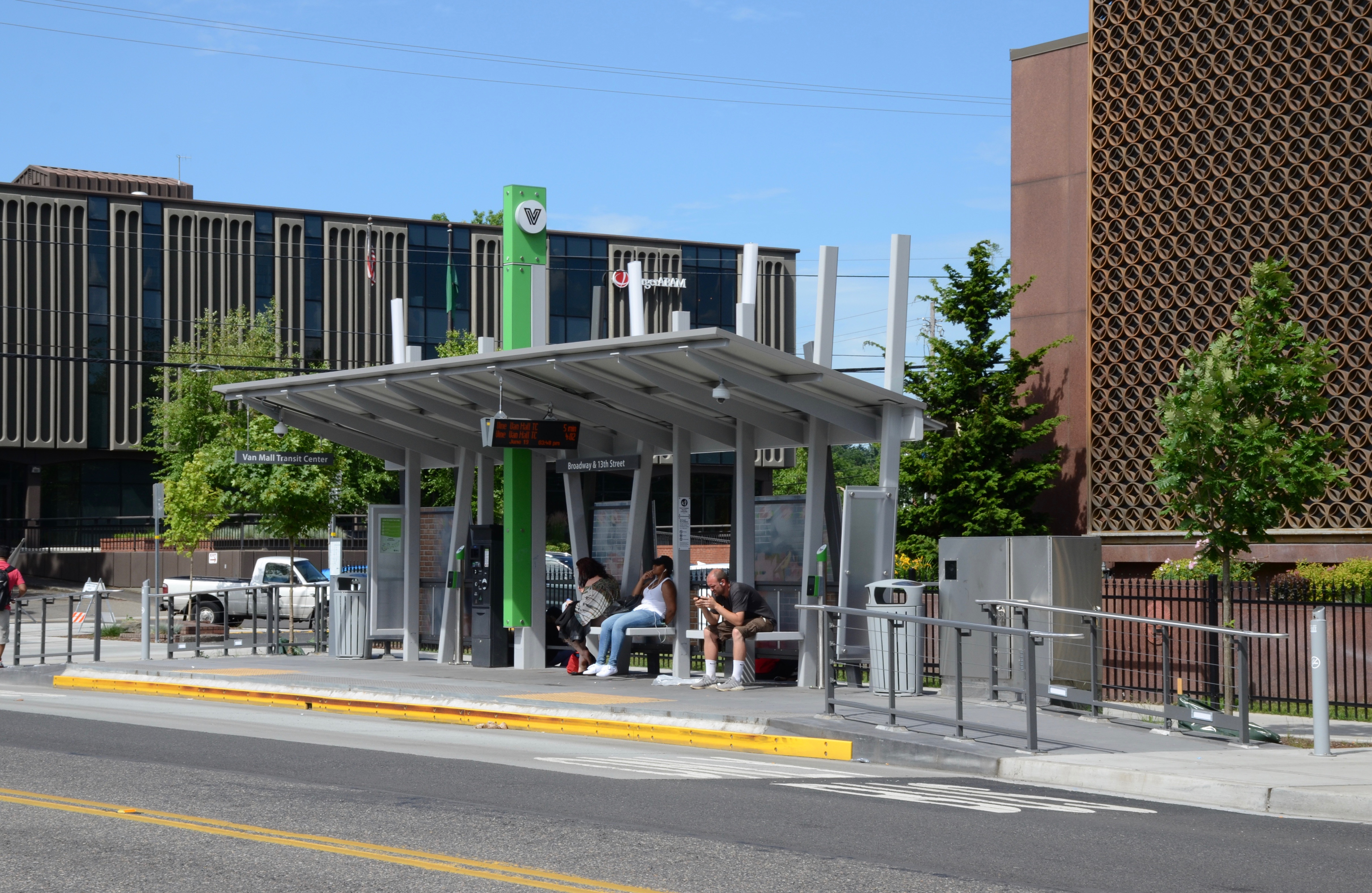
The Broadway & 13th station, in downtown

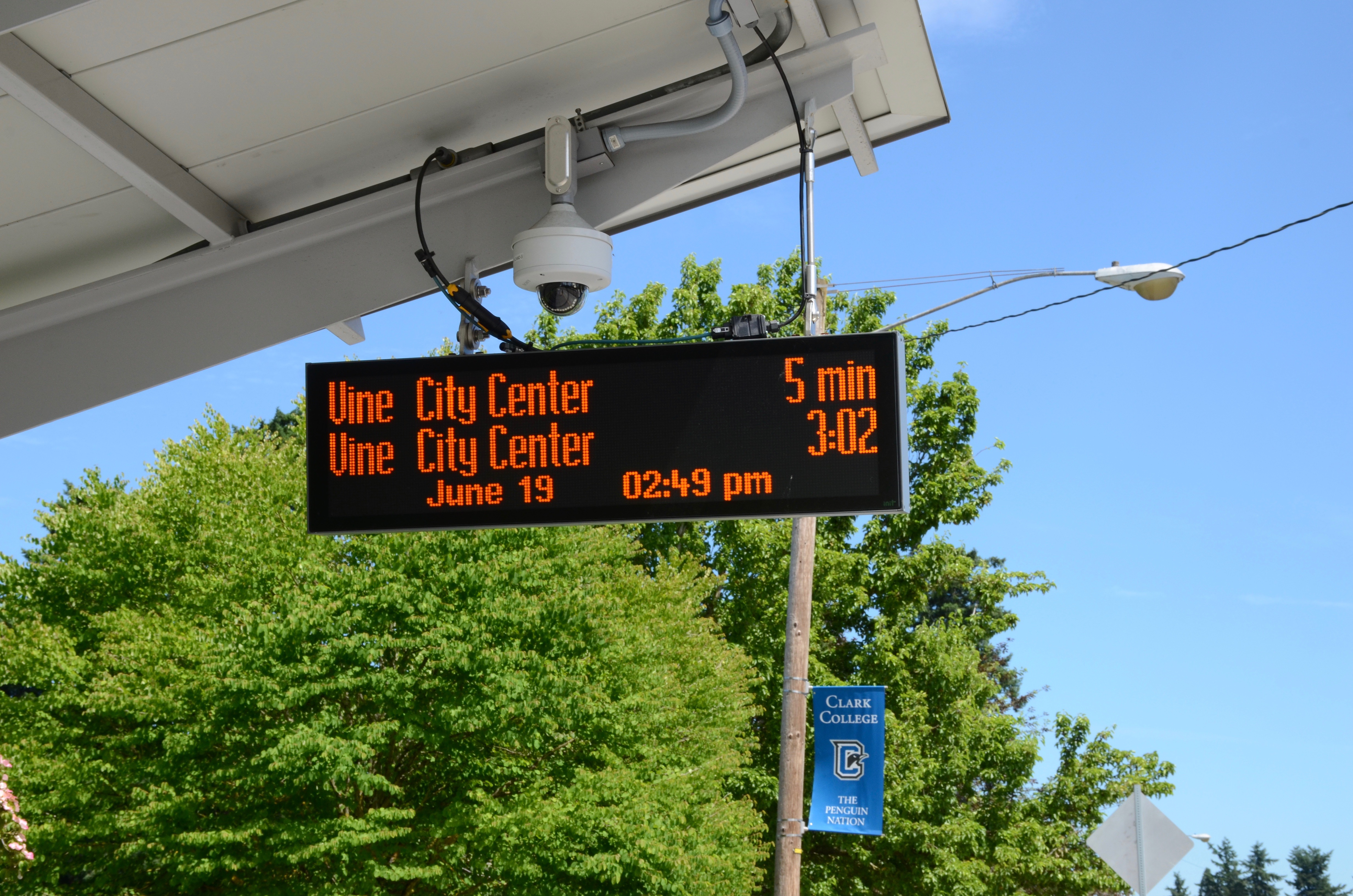
Real-time arrival information display at a Vine station

The Green Line serves 34 stations located in the city of Vancouver, Washington, primarily on Fourth Plain Boulevard between Downtown Vancouver and Vancouver Mall, located approximately 1/3 mile (0.54 km) apart. Stations consist of a 50-foot-long (15 m) platform that is raised for level boarding, and includes shelters and windscreens, ticket vending machines, real-time arrival signs.

List of Green Line stations
Stations	Direction(s)	Notes
7th Street at Turtle Place		Western terminus; connects with the Red Line
Washington & 12th Street	Westbound	
Broadway & 13th Street	Eastbound	
Broadway & 15th Street	Eastbound	
McLoughlin & Washington Street	Westbound	
Marshall/Luepke Community Center	Bidirectional	
Central Campus	Bidirectional	Serves Clark College
Gaiser Hall	Bidirectional	Serves Clark College
Fort Vancouver Way & Fourth Plain	Westbound	
Fourth Plain & Fort Vancouver Way	Eastbound	
Grand Boulevard	Bidirectional	
Todd Road	Bidirectional	
General Anderson	Bidirectional	
Stapleton Road	Bidirectional	
57th Avenue	Bidirectional	
65th Avenue	Bidirectional	
Andresen Road	Bidirectional	
78th Avenue	Bidirectional	
86th Avenue	Bidirectional	
Thurston Way	Bidirectional	
Vancouver Mall Transit Center		Eastern terminus, uses bays A and B

== Service and fares ==
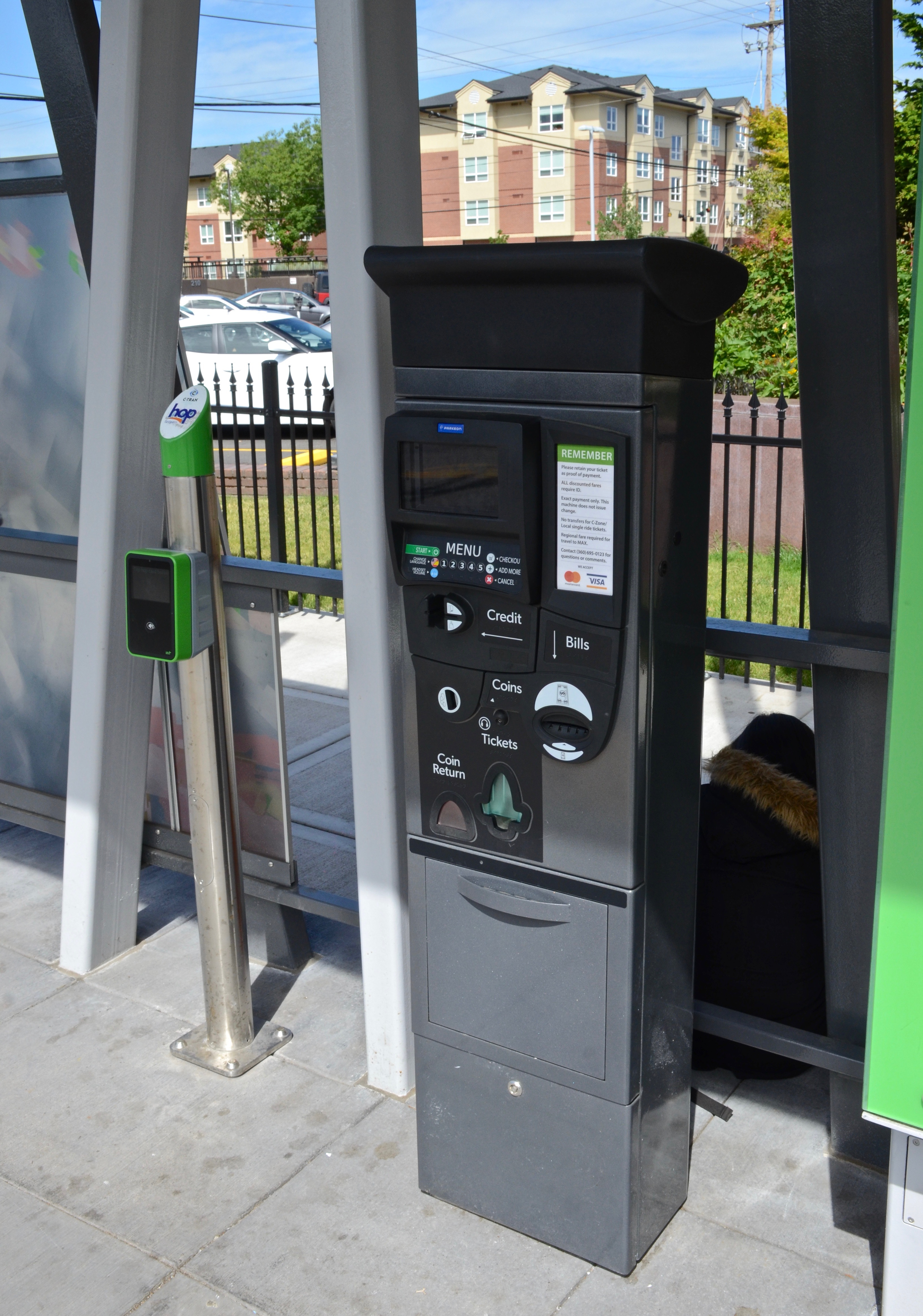
A Hop Fastpass reader and ticket vending machine at a Vine station

Buses on the Green Line run every 10 minutes during peak hours and 15 minutes during off-peak periods and on weekends. Buses run from 4:30 a.m. to 12:40 am on weekdays and from 6:00 am to 12:25 am on weekends and holidays. A $1 adult fare, the same as existing local C-Tran service, is charged to ride The Vine.

The Vine accepts the Hop Fastpass contactless smart card fare system, a new system available throughout the Portland–Vancouver metropolitan area in coordination with TriMet and the Portland Streetcar. The system launched for the general public on July 1, 2017, on TriMet, the Portland Streetcar, and C-Tran. Hop card readers were installed at all Vine stations and used for the beta testing period prior to the public launch.

C-Tran also runs a shuttle bus, route 60, from Downtown Vancouver to Jantzen Beach, Hayden Island and the Delta Park/Vanport light rail station to cross the Columbia River like former routes 4 and 44.
