= The Vine (bus rapid transit) =

Bus rapid transit service in Vancouver, Washington

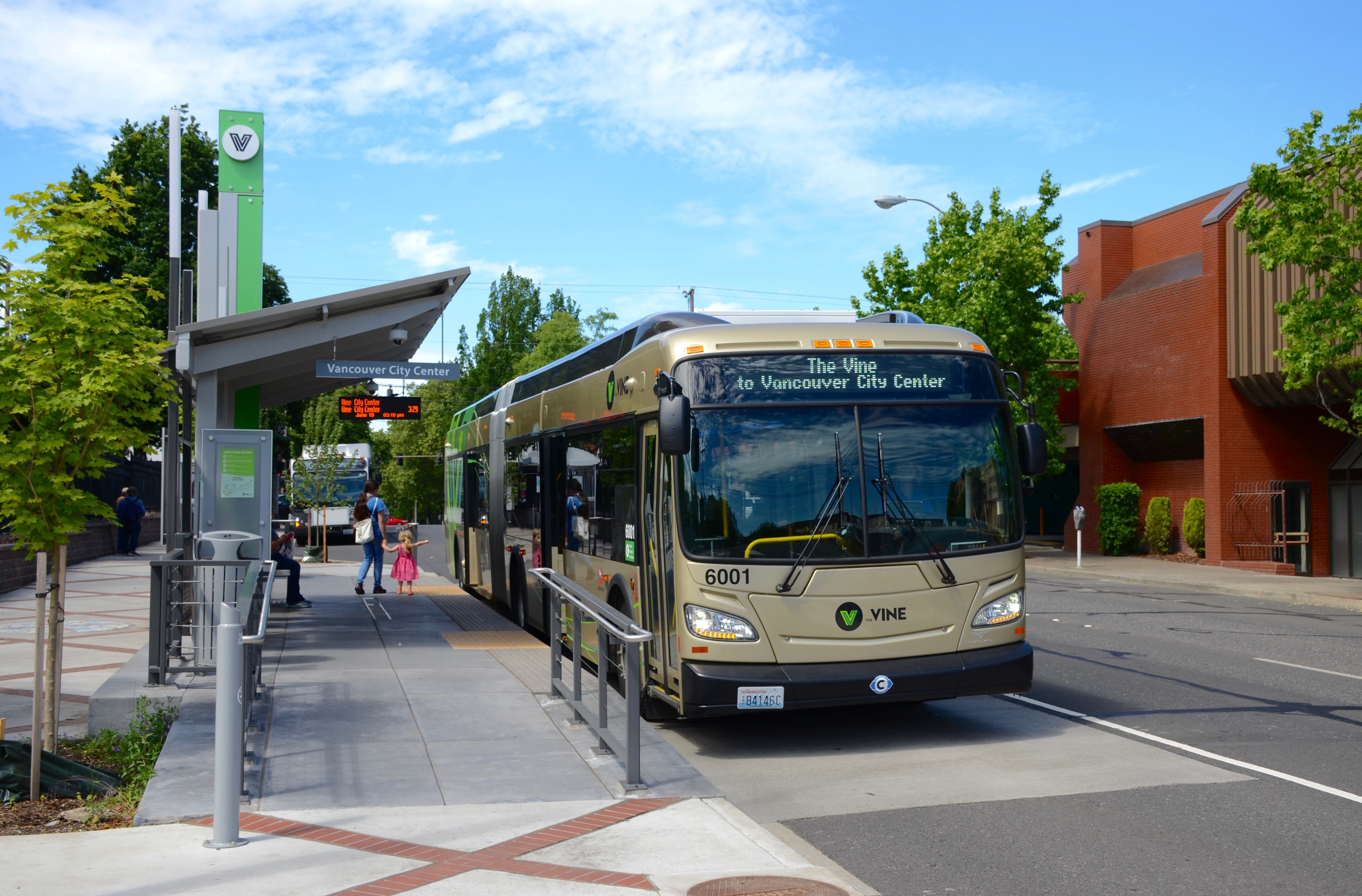
- A Vine bus in downtown Vancouver, 2017

Overview
- Locale: Vancouver, Washington, U.S.
- Transit type: Bus rapid transit
- Number of lines: 2 (1 under construction)
- Number of stations: 71
- Annual ridership: 1,905,524 (2025)
- Website: catchthevine.com

Operation
- Began operation: January 8, 2017
- Operator: C-Tran
- Number of vehicles: 28 articulated buses
- Headway: 10–15 minutes

Technical
- System length: 16 miles (26 km)

The Vine is a bus rapid transit (BRT) system operated by C-Tran in Vancouver, Washington, United States. As of 2026, it has two completed lines and one currently under construction. The Green Line, which runs along Fourth Plain Boulevard from downtown Vancouver to the Vancouver Mall, opened on January 8, 2017. The Red Line, which runs along Mill Plain Boulevard from downtown Vancouver to the eastern suburbs of the city, opened on October 1, 2023. Both lines replaced existing bus routes and operate with articulated buses.

A third line, the Purple Line, is under construction, planned to serve the Old Highway 99 corridor between downtown Vancouver and the Washington State University Vancouver campus in Salmon Creek and is scheduled to be completed and open in 2027. An extension of the Green Line to serve the eastern suburbs is planned to open in 2028.

== Lines ==
=== Green Line ===
The Green Line, also known as The Vine on Fourth Plain, serves a 6-mile (9.7 km) route with 34 stations and runs primarily in mixed traffic on Fourth Plain Boulevard. It travels from its western terminus at Turtle Place in downtown Vancouver to the Vancouver Mall Transit Center. The line opened on January 8, 2017, following a community celebration; the first day of service with The Vine's articulated buses was on January 9 due to a winter storm. In its first year of service, The Vine carried 45 percent more riders than Route 4 and operating costs decreased by 21 percent.

=== Red Line ===
The Red Line, also known as The Vine on Mill Plain, serves 37 stations on a 10-mile (16 km) section of Mill Plain Boulevard between downtown Vancouver and the Clark College Columbia Tech Center campus. It opened on October 1, 2023, and is the second line in The Vine system. Planning for the line began in 2018 and construction on the $50 million project began in 2021. The Red Line replaced Route 37 on the same corridor and drew over 115,000 riders in its first two months of service—a 30 percent increase from Route 37 ridership in late 2022.

== Stations ==
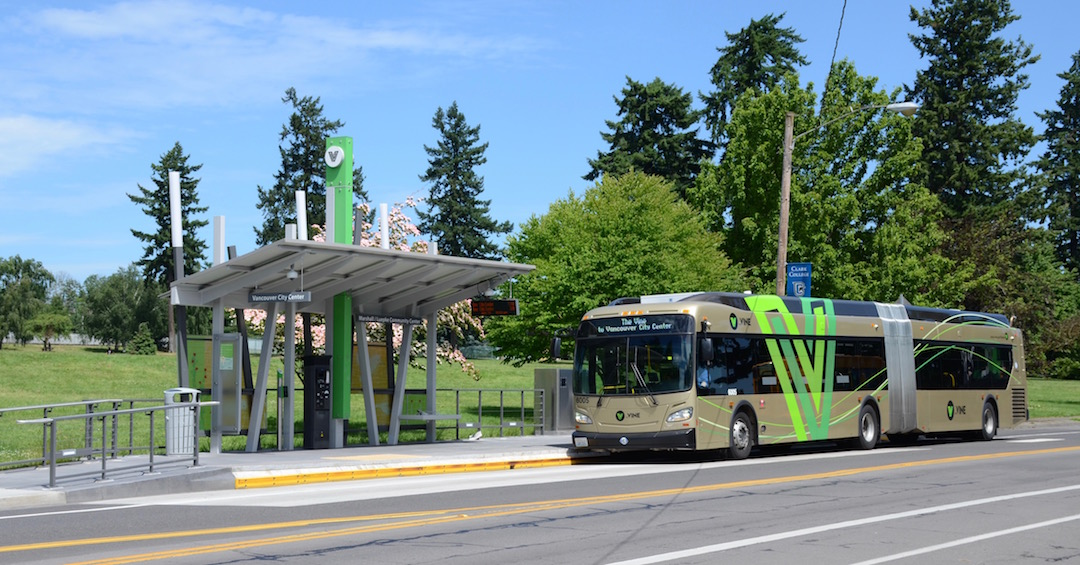
A Vine bus pulling into the Marshall Community Center station in 2017

The system serves 71 stations in the city of Vancouver, Washington that are generally spaced 1/3 mile (0.54 km) apart. The Vine's stations consist of a 50-foot-long (15 m) platform that is raised for level boarding, and includes shelters, windscreens, ticket vending machines, and real-time arrival signs.

== Service and fares ==
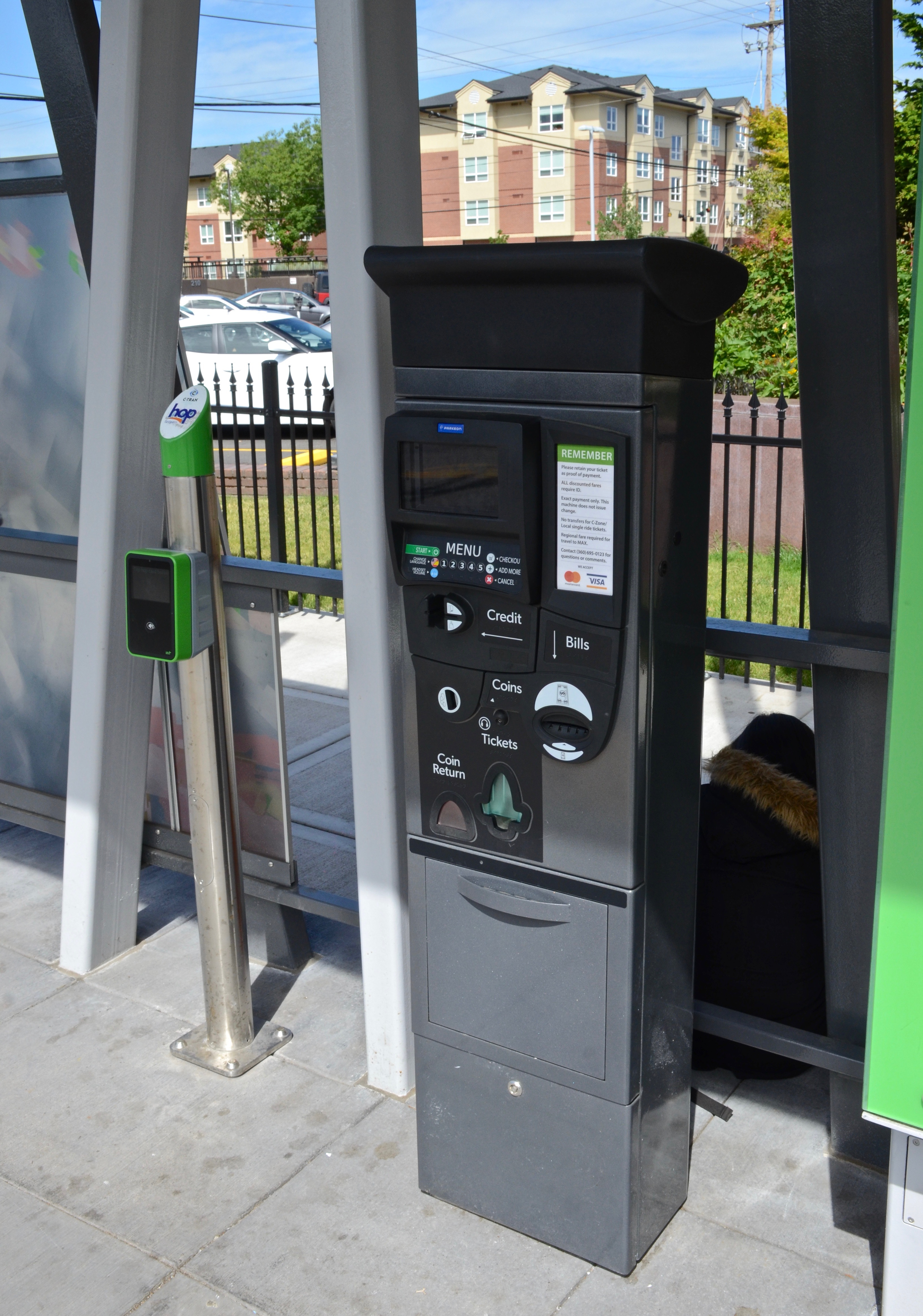
A Hop Fastpass reader and ticket vending machine at a Vine station

The Vine runs every 10 minutes during peak hours and 15 minutes during off-peak periods and on weekends. Buses run from 4:30 a.m. to 12:40 am on weekdays and from 6:00 am to 12:25 am on weekends and holidays. A $1.50 adult fare, the same as existing local C-Tran service, is charged to ride The Vine. Fares are paid prior to boarding at stations, which feature ticket vending machines, and are enforced by fare compliance officers at random times.

The Vine accepts the Hop Fastpass contactless smart card fare system, available throughout the Portland–Vancouver metropolitan area in coordination with TriMet and the Portland Streetcar. The system launched for the general public on July 1, 2017, on TriMet, the Portland Streetcar, and C-Tran. Hop card readers were installed at all Vine stations and used for the beta testing period prior to the public launch.

C-Tran also runs a shuttle bus, route 60, from Downtown Vancouver to Jantzen Beach, Hayden Island and the Delta Park/Vanport light rail station to cross the Columbia River like former routes 4 and 44.

== Fleet ==
The Vine uses a fleet of 10 New Flyer Xcelsior XDE60 diesel-electric hybrid buses and 18 New Flyer Xcelsior XD60 diesel buses that measure 60 feet (18 m) long and carry up to 100 people. The articulated buses are low-floor, have three doors, and include three interior bicycle racks. The first of 10 buses for the Green Line were delivered in April 2016 and were given commemorative names. An additional eight articulated buses were ordered for the Red Line. Ten more were ordered in anticipation of the opening of the Purple Line on Highway 99.

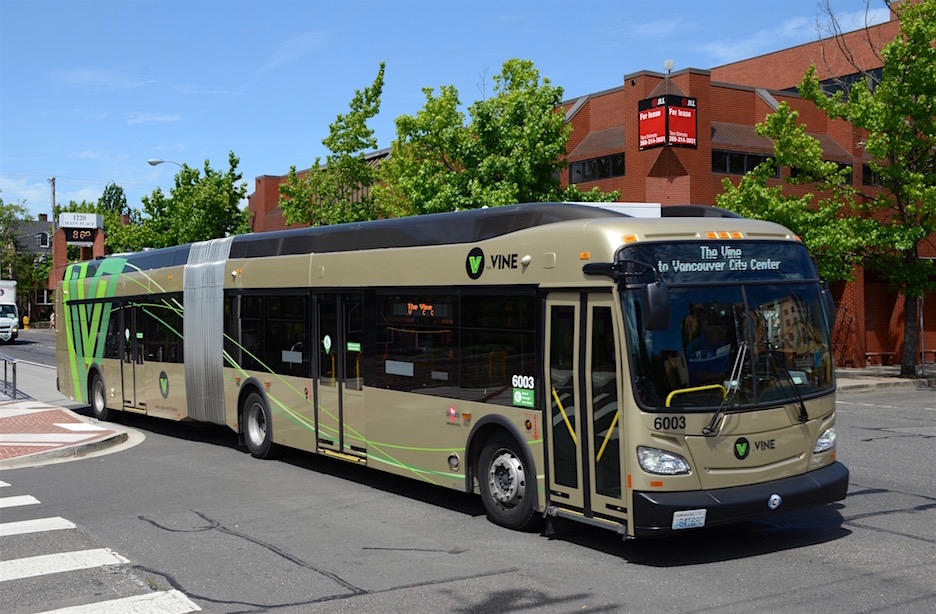
One of the Vine's 10 New Flyer XDE60 buses

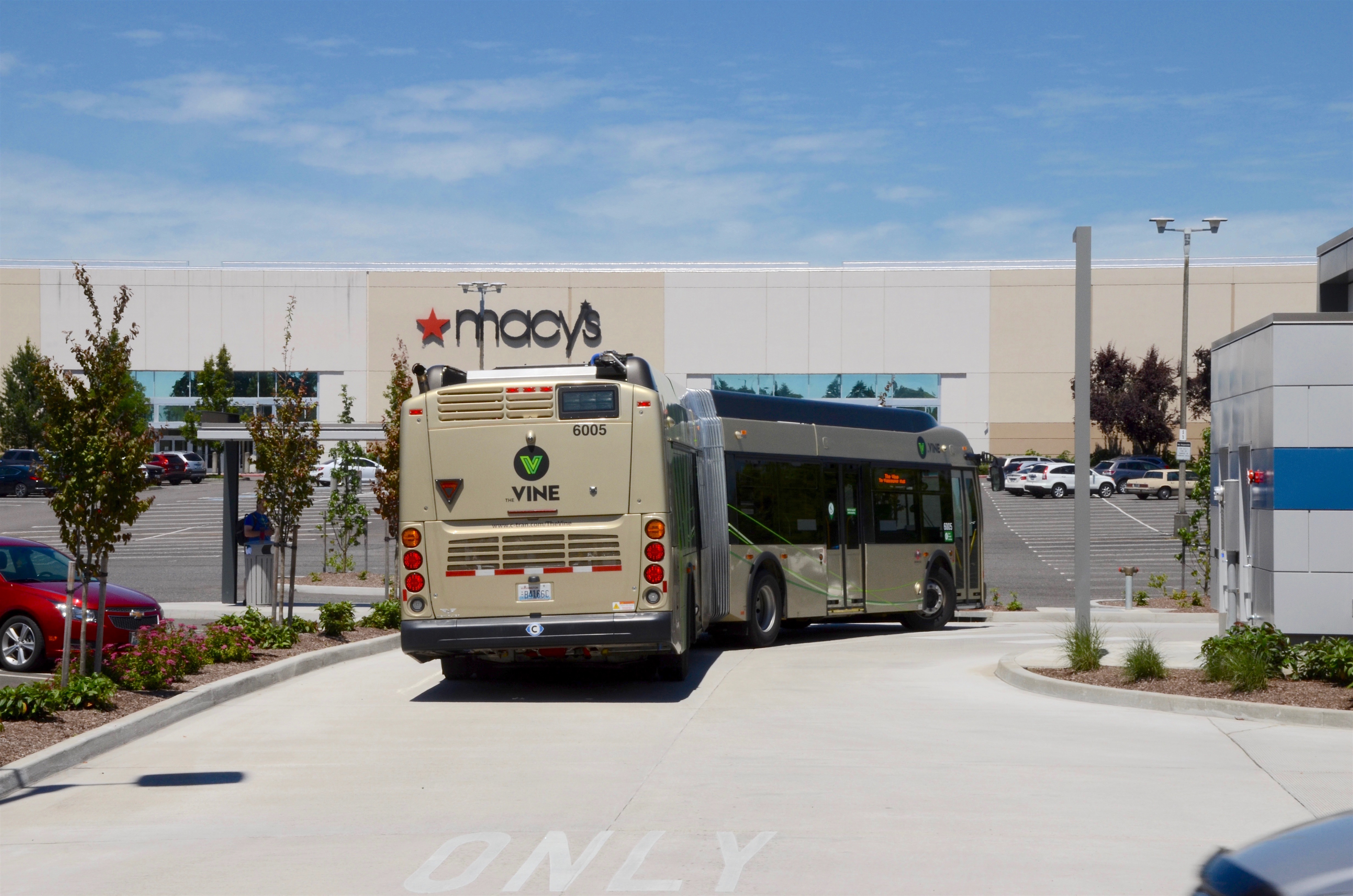
A Vine bus bending as it enters the Vancouver Mall Transit Center

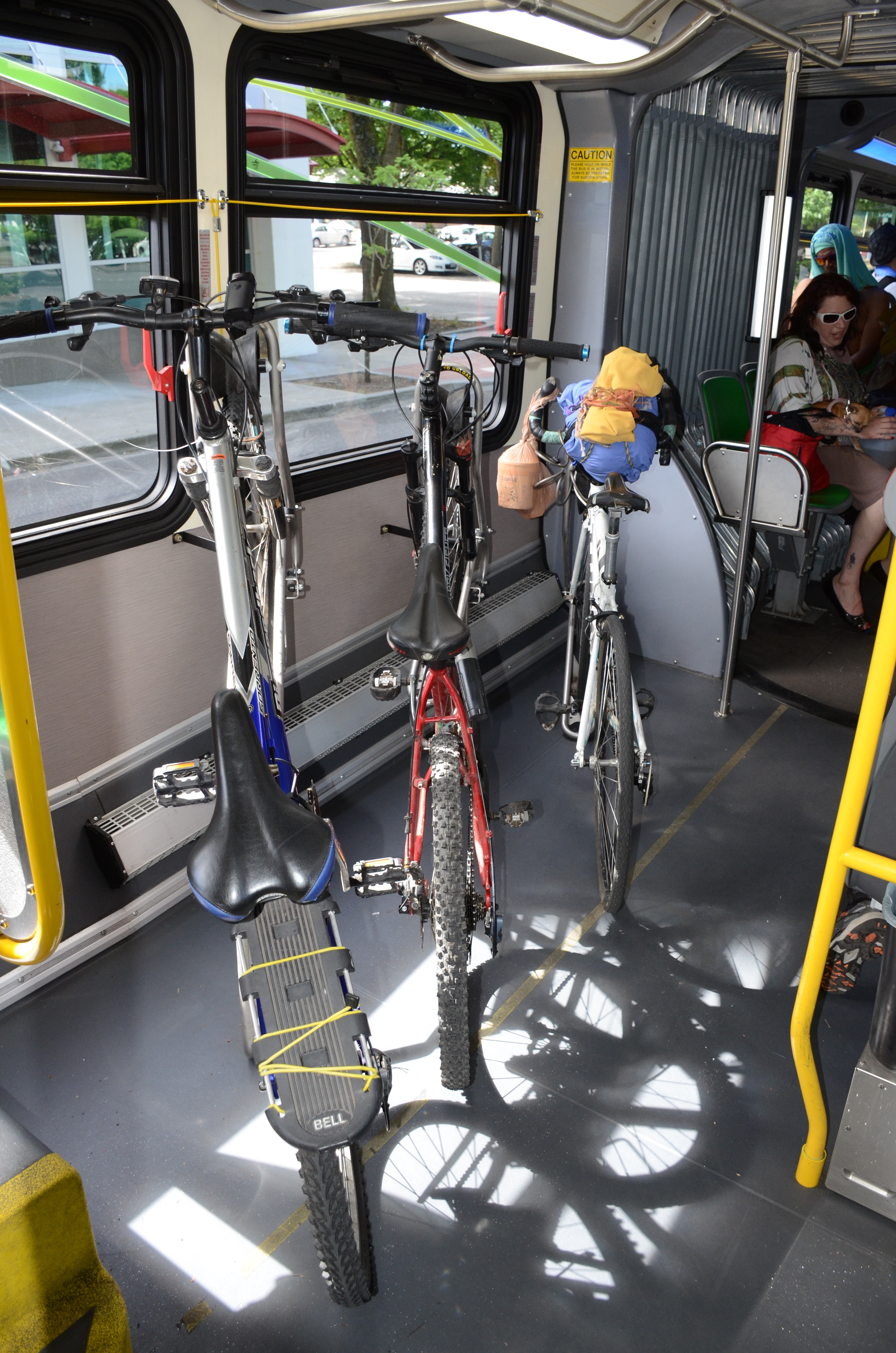
All three interior bike racks in use on a Vine bus

== History ==
The Southwest Washington Regional Transportation Council (RTC) began studying high-capacity transit for Vancouver and Clark County in 2008, and determined that bus rapid transit would be viable on four main corridors: Highway 99, Fourth Plain Boulevard, Interstate 205, and Mill Plain Boulevard. C-Tran, the county's transit agency, adopted a 20-year long-range plan in 2010 that recommended building the first bus rapid transit line on Fourth Plain. The Fourth Plain corridor had been served by local routes 4 and 44, the two busiest in the C-Tran system, which continued to northern Portland, Oregon.

Design concepts for a Fourth Plain bus rapid transit service were presented in 2011 and 2012, and a locally-preferred alternative was adopted by C-Tran, the Vancouver City Council, and RTC in 2012. On November 6, 2012, C-Tran placed a 0.1 percent sales tax increase on the general election ballot to fund a light rail extension from Portland to Downtown Vancouver via a new bridge, as well as operating costs of the Fourth Plain bus rapid transit project. While the ballot measure was rejected, the bus rapid transit project moved forward and was granted Federal Transit Administration (FTA) funding in 2014.

The project was named "The Vine" after a public naming contest in 2014, beating out other candidates by "evoking greenery, leaves and branches". A groundbreaking ceremony was held on August 24, 2015, kicking off construction of the $53 million project. Service began on January 8, 2017, using 40-foot (12 m) buses in place of the service's articulated buses, and stopping at route 4 stops rather than stations, due to a winter storm. The articulated buses, which lack drop-down tire chains that would allow for operations in winter conditions, debuted the following day instead. Fares are paid prior to boarding at stations, which feature ticket vending machines, and are enforced by fare compliance officers at random times. In its first year of service, The Vine carried 45 percent more riders than Route 4 and operating costs decreased by 21 percent.

The Vine was the first bus rapid transit system to open in the Portland metropolitan area, and was followed in 2022 by the Frequent Express service between Portland and Gresham.

=== System expansion ===
In February 2018, the C-Tran Board of Directors approved a design contract for a potential bus rapid transit project on Mill Plain Boulevard, an east–west corridor to the south of The Vine's Fourth Plain Boulevard. Preliminary plans for the project was approved in 2019 and was followed by agreements with the city government on property acquisition and upgrading fiber optic lines along the corridor.

The Mill Plain line, covering 9.9 miles (15.9 km) from the shared terminus at Turtle Place in Downtown Vancouver to Clark College's Columbia Tech Center near Southeast 192nd Avenue, will have 37 stations and is anticipated to cost $50 million. Half of the anticipated costs will be covered by a grant from the Federal Transit Administration that was announced in May 2020. Project construction began in September 2021 and the line began service on October 1, 2023.

=== Future expansion ===
A third line in The Vine system, designated as the Purple Line, is under construction; it will follow Main Street and Old Highway 99 between downtown Vancouver, Hazel Dell, and Salmon Creek. Construction of the Purple Line officially began with a groundbreaking ceremony in July 2025. Its northern terminus will be at the Washington State University Vancouver campus northeast of Salmon Creek; the southern terminus will be at the city's waterfront adjacent to downtown Vancouver. The 9-mile (14 km) line is scheduled to be completed in 2027 at a cost of $52 million.

The Green Line is also planned to be extended east into Orchards and south along Northeast 162nd Avenue to Fisher's Landing Transit Center, a major regional hub near the Columbia River, by 2027.
