= C-Tran (Washington) =

Public transit operator in Clark County, Washington

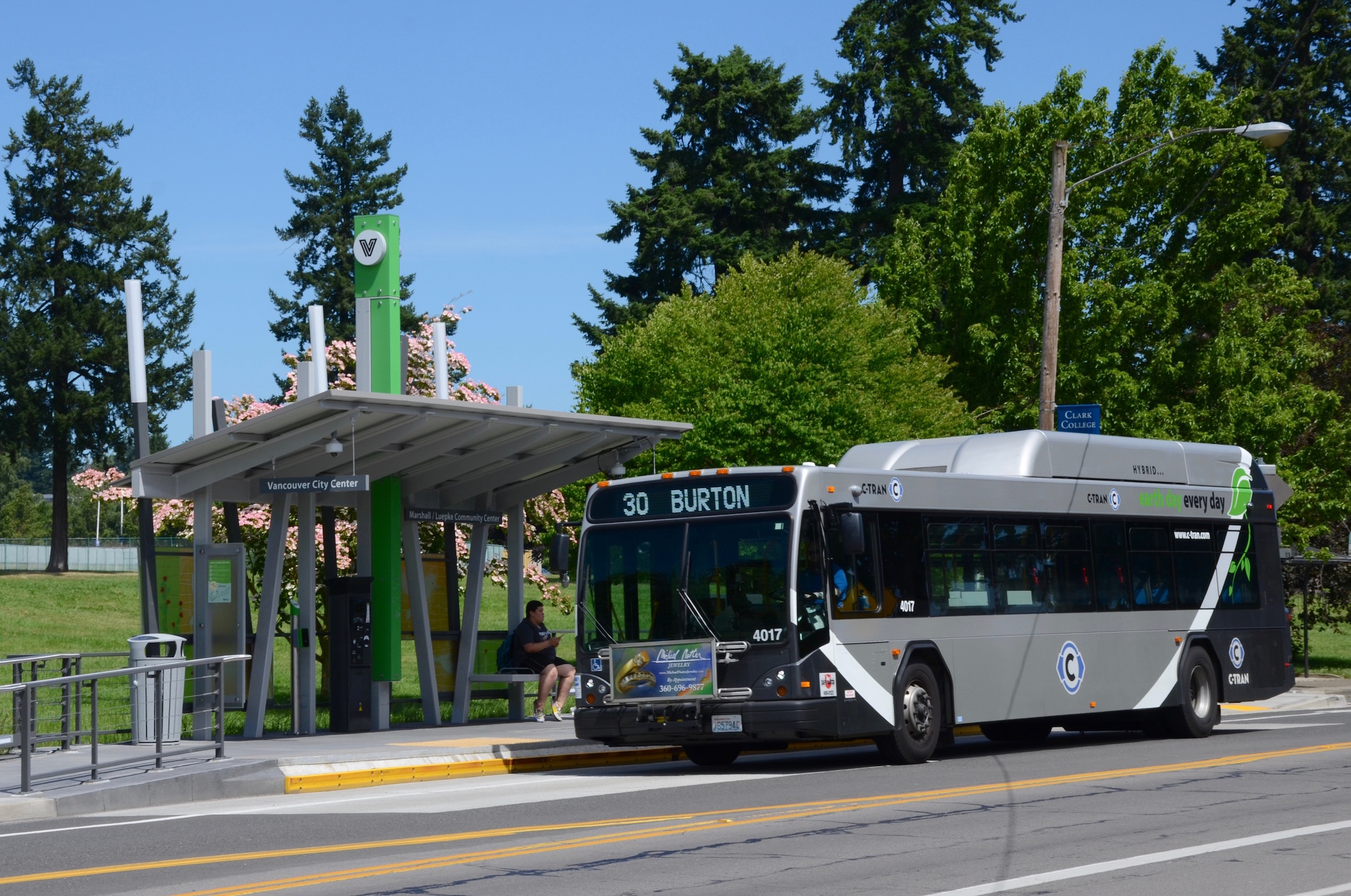
- A hybrid-electric bus passing a station for The Vine
- Founded: July 1, 1981
- Headquarters: 10600 NE 51st Circle; Vancouver, Washington, U.S.
- Locale: Clark County, Washington
- Service type: Fixed route bus service, paratransit, microtransit, vanpool
- Routes: 28
- Stops: 876
- Hubs: 4 transit centers, 2 park and rides
- Fleet: 129 buses 80 paratransit vehicles 20 vanpool vehicles
- Daily ridership: 18,300 (weekdays, Q2 2026)
- Annual ridership: 5,279,300 (2025)
- Fuel type: Diesel, diesel–electric hybrid, electric
- Chief executive: Leann M. Caver
- Employees: 518 (2026)
- Website: www.c-tran.com

C-Tran (stylized as C-TRAN), more formally the Clark County Public Transit Benefit Area Authority, is a public transit agency serving Clark County, Washington, United States. Its service area is centered around Vancouver and also includes the cities of Battle Ground, Camas, Washougal, and Yacolt. C-Tran operates fixed route buses, paratransit, dial-a-ride shuttles, and vanpool service within Clark County, as well as paratransit services. The agency also provides express commuter buses between Clark County and Downtown Portland, Oregon, and all-day regional services to the MAX Light Rail stations and Oregon Health and Science University. In 2025, the system had a ridership of 5,279,300, or about 18,300 per weekday as of the second quarter of 2026.

The agency was founded in 1981 and is primarily funded by a sales tax that was approved by voters within the public transportation benefit area. C-Tran operates four transit centers: Vancouver Mall, Fisher's Landing in east county, 99th Street at Stockford Village, and Mill Plain near Camas, as well as two park and rides: Salmon Creek, and Andresen. The system has 28 fixed routes, including two bus rapid transit services named The Vine: the Green Line on Fourth Plain Boulevard; and the Red Line on Mill Plain Boulevard. C-Tran has 129 buses for fixed routes and 80 vans for paratransit and microtransit use.

== History ==
=== Pre-2000 ===
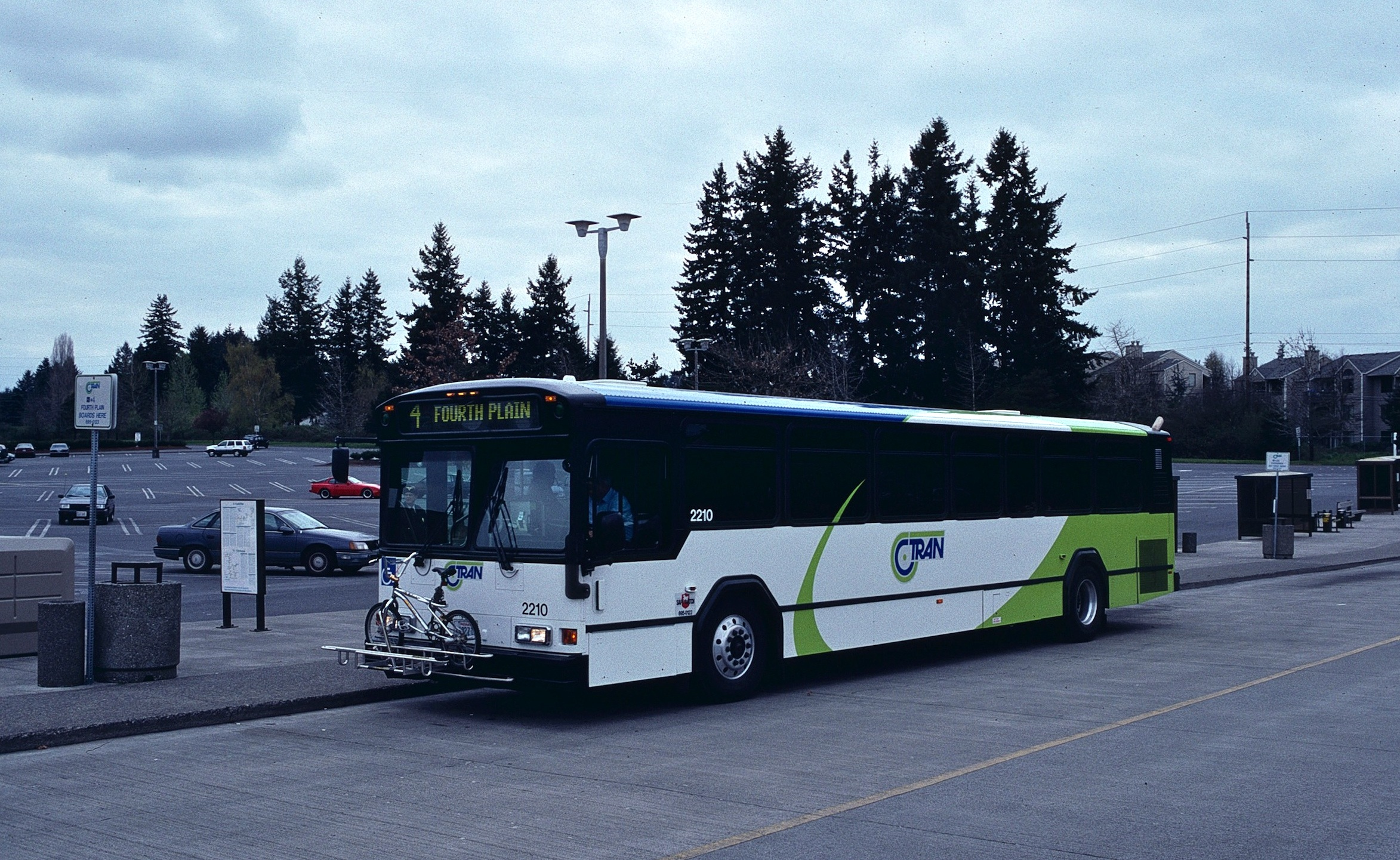
A C-Tran Gillig Phantom in a later paint scheme. The agency retired their last bus of this model in 2024.

The formation of a public transportation benefit area (PTBA) for Clark County was discussed in October 1975 as part of a conference of local officials who sought to improve transit beyond Vancouver, which had a municipal system. The conference was disbanded without an agreement to form a PTBA, but talks between the county government and suburban cities resumed in March 1980; Vancouver later joined as a party to the talks in May after being initially disinterested. The PTBA board was formed in August 1980 with the goal of proposing a ballot measure to approve a 0.3 percent sales tax to fund a countywide transit system. The sales tax was approved by 55 percent of Clark County voters during the general election on November 4, 1980, and would take effect at the beginning of the following year.

The bus system was formally established on January 1, 1981, and took over the operations of the municipal Vancouver Transit System. The assets were transferred on April 25. The existing Vancouver system was originally established in May 1969 and funded by a $1 monthly household tax that was abolished by the approval of the PTBA sales tax. The PTBA board selected the Columbia Transit System, branded as "C-Tran", as the system's name in March 1981 and began preparations for the transfer of assets from the Vancouver Transit assets in late April. C-Tran formally launched its countywide service on July 6, 1981, with a fleet of 21 buses that reached as far as Battle Ground and eastern Vancouver.

TriMet, the Portland-based transit system, also operated express buses from Vancouver that crossed the Columbia River. They had taken over from the Vancouver–Portland Bus Company, which ran 35 daily round trips, and initially contracted with C-Tran once the agency was established. C-Tran took over the peak-only express buses in 1983 and continued to purchase all-day and weekend service from TriMet to connect Portland and Vancouver on its local routes. The agency also expanded to eastern Portland with express routes on the Glenn L. Jackson Memorial Bridge, which carries Interstate 205 over the Columbia River. A proposal to extend TriMet's MAX Light Rail service from Portland to Vancouver was put on a ballot measure in February 1995 and rejected by voters in Clark County.

During a September 1997 construction project that closed the northbound Interstate Bridge, C-Tran temporarily acquired 100 surplus buses from King County Metro in Seattle for use on additional trips and hired 140 operators, including off-duty TriMet employees or recent retirees.

=== Sales tax propositions (2000s) ===
The logo of C-Tran from 1981 to 2007

In 1999, Washington voters approved Initiative 695, which had repealed most of the motor vehicle excise tax. The initiative was ruled unconstitutional, but its repeals were implemented by the state legislature and removed 40 percent of C-Tran's annual revenue. C-Tran began to draw from its reserve funds, originally intended for fleet and facility improvements, to continue operations until its first set of cuts could be proposed and implemented in July 2000. The service cuts included layoffs for 80 positions in the agency, changes to 25 routes, and the elimination of service after 9:15 p.m. on weekdays. A new transit center at Fischer's Landing opened to serve eastern Clark County and replace Evergreen Transit Center, which was repurposed as a minor park-and-ride lot.

In 2004, C-Tran proposed Proposition 1, which would allow the agency to increase its sales tax by 0.3 percent, to replace motor vehicle excise tax revenue and depleted reserves. The ballot measure was defeated by a 54 percent majority of voters in the November 2004 general election. As a result of the lost revenue and the near depletion of reserve funds, C-Tran planned to reduce its bus and paratransit services by 46 percent in September 2005. This included 14 routes; all service to Ridgefield, Camas, and Washougal; most weekday service after 8 p.m.; and a significant portion of weekend service. Commuter service from Vancouver to Downtown Portland would be replaced by a shorter shuttle route that terminated at Delta Park/Vanport station on the MAX Yellow Line. The C-Tran board of directors also considered a fare increase, elimination of free transfers, and termination of a reciprocal fare agreement with TriMet.

A new fare structure was introduced in May 2005 to prepare for potential service reductions. A "premium" fare, equivalent to double the former fare, was added to most routes that originated in Portland and would require a specific monthly or daily pass that was separate from those used on other routes. On June 1, 2005, the agency approved a boundary change to remove most of rural Clark County from its service area and taxing district ahead of a second ballot measure. The resulting boundaries only included the cities of Vancouver, Camas, Washougal, Ridgefield, La Center, Battle Ground and Yacolt, as well as the unincorporated areas surrounding Vancouver. A smaller sales tax increase of 0.2 percent was approved by 67 percent of voters in the primary election on September 20, 2005. The restoration of service to areas in northern Clark County began in January 2006 and was followed by other changes later in the year.

C-Tran expanded its local service across the Columbia River to Hayden Island and Delta Park/Vanport station in August 2007. A shuttle route replaced TriMet's local Line 6 bus that had previously crossed the state line. The agency opened its Hazel Dell hub, the 99th Street Transit Center, in November 2007. The opening ceremonies included the unveiling of a new logo and color scheme—silver and royal blue.

=== 2010s to present ===
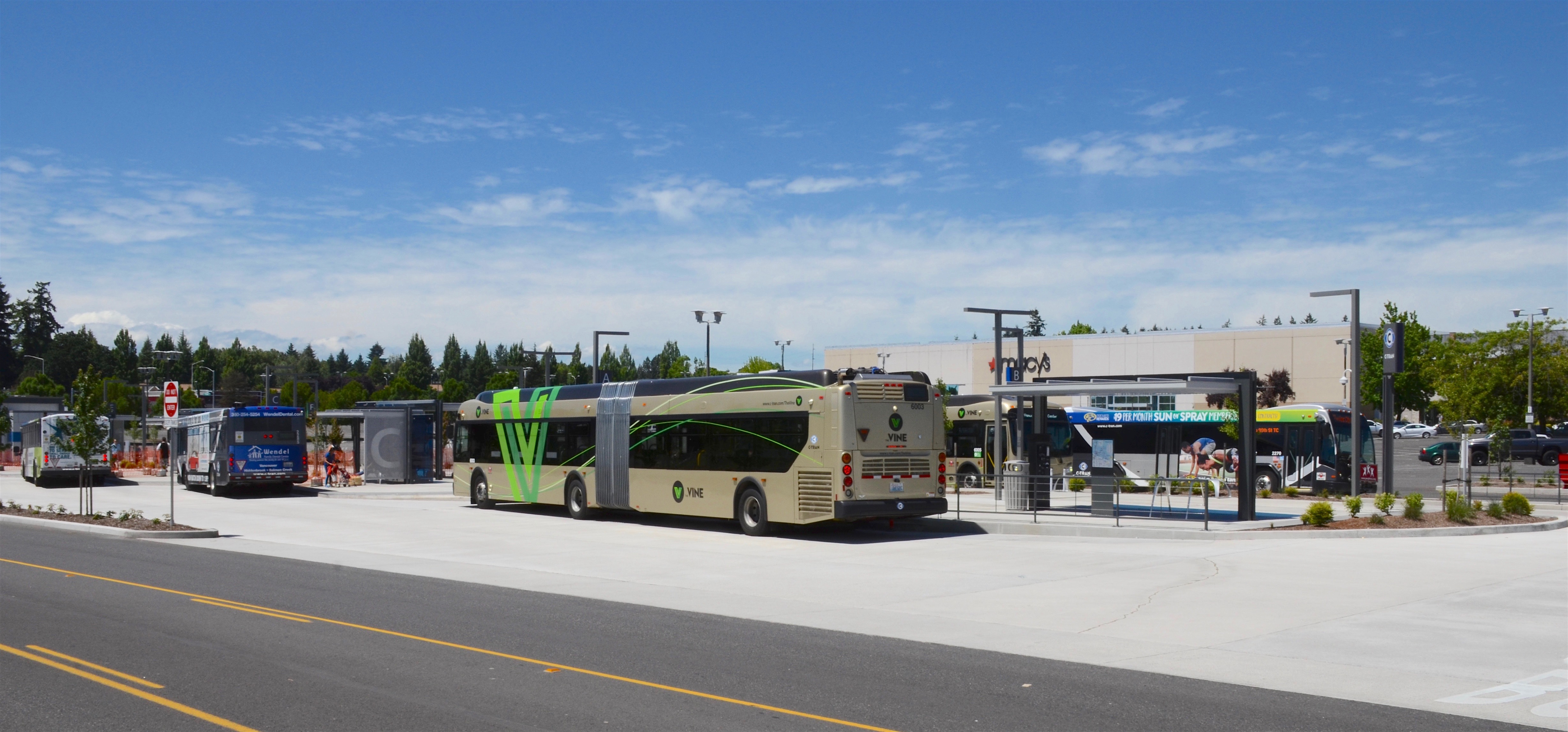
The new Vancouver Mall Transit Center opened in 2017, replacing a previous transit center at the mall.

A ballot measure to raise C-Tran's sales tax rate by 0.2 percent was passed by voters within the service area in November 2011. The increase was proposed to replenish reserve funds and continue existing levels of service after years of deficits during the Great Recession, which had affected sales tax revenue. A separate ballot measure was proposed in 2012 to raise the sales tax rate by 0.1 percent for a bus rapid transit line and an extension of the MAX Yellow Line into Vancouver on the new Columbia River Crossing bridge. Voters rejected the sales tax, which had been tied to the bridge project and opposed by anti-toll and anti-rail activists.

After studies that had first taken place in 2008, plans were approved and finalized in 2012 for construction of a bus rapid transit line, eventually named The Vine. It opened for service on January 8, 2017, on Fourth Plain Boulevard. The project's local funding was derived from C-Tran's existing sales tax in lieu of the rejected 2012 portion. An existing transit center at Vancouver Mall was moved to a new location on the south side of the complex to become the eastern terminus of the Vine.

C-Tran was named the North American Transit System of the Year in 2019 by the American Public Transportation Association. It won the award again in 2022.

The agency moved its administrative headquarters in 2019 to a standalone building on NE 51st Circle in Vancouver. This building was formerly the offices of the supervisor of the Gifford Pinchot National Forest. In June 2020, the former Evergreen Transit Center was converted to a safe parking site for persons experiencing homelessness.

The Mill Plain Transit Center was opened on October 1, 2023, as the terminus of the Vine Red Line.

== Service ==
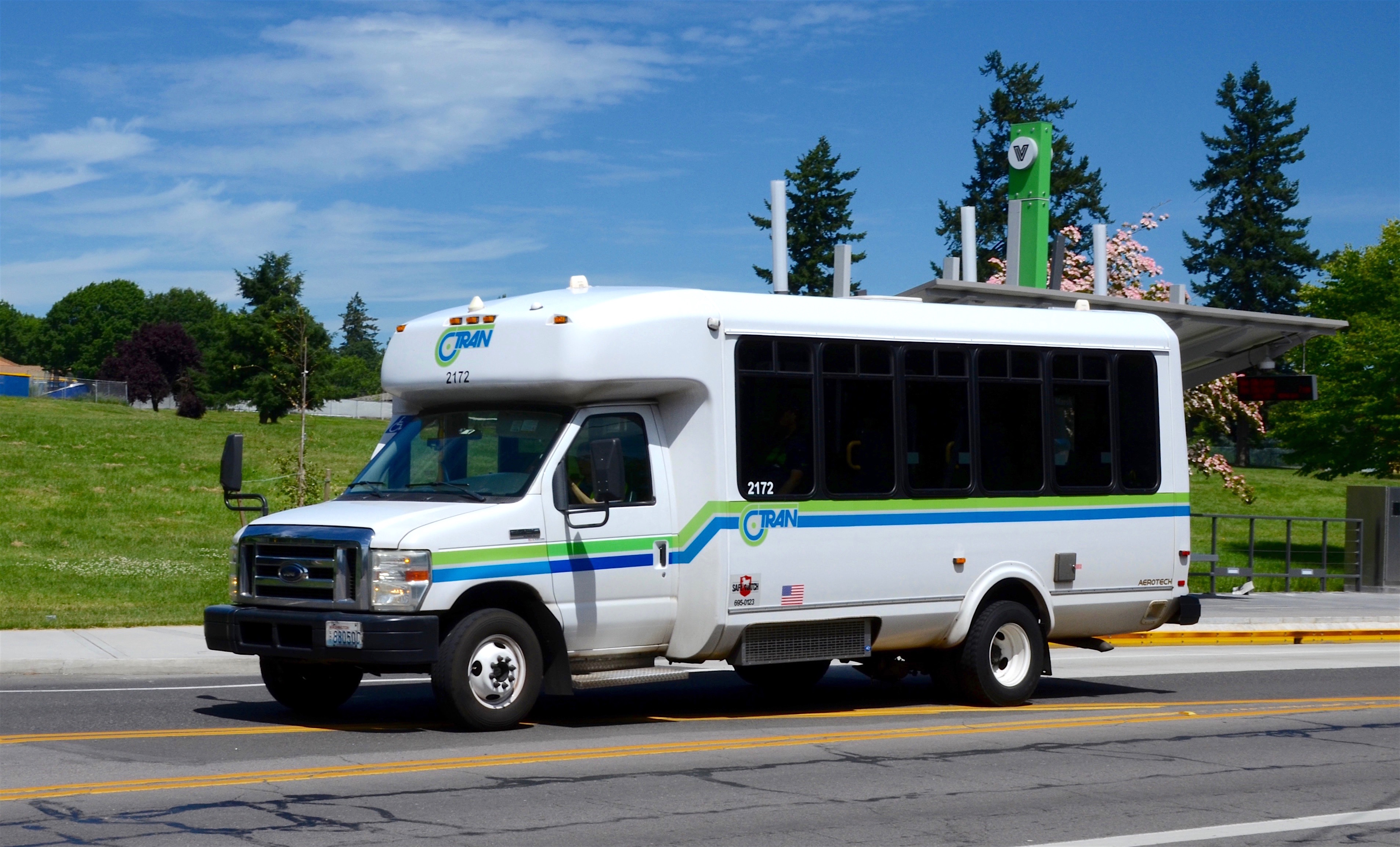
A minibus in "C-Van" paratransit service

C-Tran operates seven days a week. Sunday and holiday services are reduced, with trips to and from Portland being less frequent, and some express and limited routes may not run. Local service starts at about 6:15 am and ends about midnight. Weekday express and limited service to Portland begins at 5:20 am with the last trip to Vancouver at 7 pm. On weekends, there is no service to Portland excluding the 60 (Delta Park Limited) to Delta Park/Vanport MAX Station and Jantzen Beach and the 65 (Parkrose Limited) to Parkrose/Sumner Transit Center. Weekend service on route 60 starts at about 6:30 am and the last trip from Delta Park/Vanport departs at midnight. Weekend service on route 65 starts at about 8:30 am with the last trip to Vancouver departing at about 6:40 pm. The Current (formerly known as the Connector), a dial-a-ride service, runs from 5:30 am to 7:00 pm on weekdays.

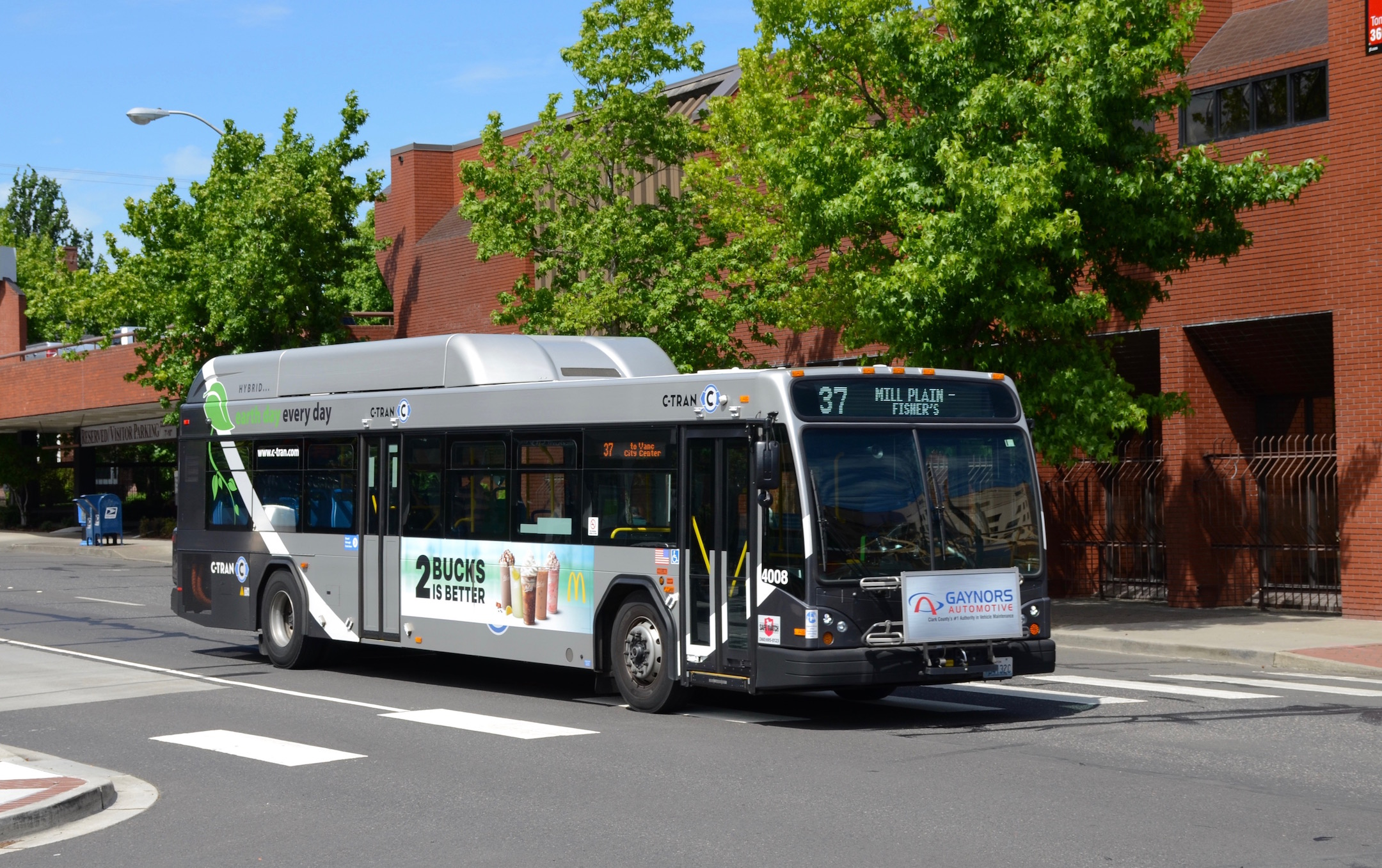
A Gillig BRT low-floor bus in C-Tran's current paint scheme (except for the Vine service) in downtown in 2017

C-Tran operates 20 local routes, which generally run every 15 to 60 minutes, and two bus rapid transit routes that are branded as The Vine and operate at higher frequencies with dedicated stations. The Vine's Green Line has the highest ridership in the system, with 1.1 million trips in 2025. C-Tran operates three express routes to the Portland Transit Mall in Downtown Portland and one rout to the Marquam Hill medical complex. A ride on all these buses require an express fare, and transfers issued on these routes are valid for travel on all C-Tran and TriMet routes. In addition, C-Tran operates three limited-stop routes; the 41 serves Fisher's Landing Transit Center and Downtown Vancouver. Route 60 serves TriMet's Delta Park/Vanport MAX Station, while route 65 connects to TriMet's Parkrose/Sumner Transit Center.

The agency's paratransit service, C-Van, serves passengers with disabilities or senior citizens who are enrolled in the service; it requires advance reservation and has a different fare from fixed route buses. The C-Van service area comprises the entire urban growth boundary of Vancouver as well as areas within 3/4 mile (1.2 km) of a fixed local route operated by C-Tran per requirements in the federal Americans with Disabilities Act. C-Tran also operates the Shopping Shuttle, a twice-monthly route that serves senior living locations and grocery stores with long layovers at stops. Since 2023, C-Tran has also operated The Current, a dial-a-ride microtransit system with zones in Camas, Ridgefield, La Center, and Washougal.

=== The Vine ===
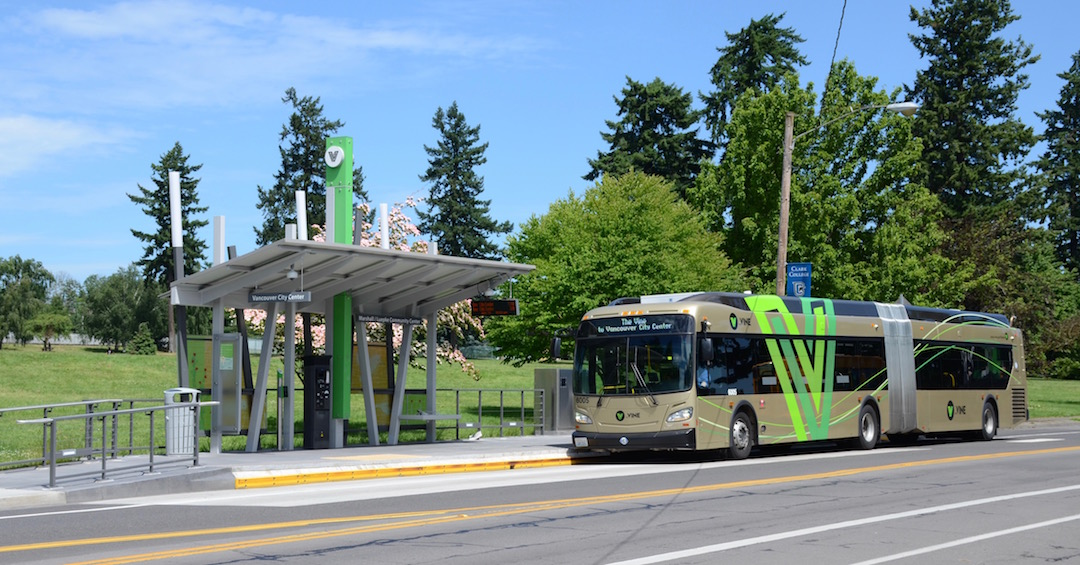
A Vine bus arriving at the Marshall Community Center station

The Vine is a bus rapid transit service along Fourth Plain Boulevard and Fort Vancouver Way between downtown Vancouver and Vancouver Mall. Ten new low-floor, articulated, hybrid buses provide service every 10–15 minutes in mixed traffic to curbside stations. The Vine replaced routes 4 and 44, which collectively carried over 6,000 trips daily. Among the project's expected benefits were that transit signal priority and off-board fare collection would increase the speed of the bus by about ten minutes compared to existing service. Studies on the corridor began in 2008, and funding for the $53 million project was approved in July 2014, with 80% federal money, 6% state, and 14% local. A full funding grant agreement for $38.5 million from the Federal Transit Administration was signed on September 10, 2015.

Construction began with a groundbreaking ceremony held at the planned downtown terminus on August 24, 2015, and finished in January 2017. A grand opening ceremony was held on January 7, 2017, and it officially opened on January 8, 2017. The original line on Fourth Plain was later renamed the Green Line.

In 2018, C-Tran proposed the Mill Plain BRT, a new bus line to the Vine system that connects downtown Vancouver to the newly constructed Mill Plain Transit Center via Mill Plain Blvd. Service started on October 1, 2023, as the Red Line. The Purple Line on Old Highway 99 between Downtown Vancouver and Salmon Creek began construction in 2025 and is planned to open in 2027.

== Fares ==
C-Tran has a regular adult fare of $1.50 for local routes, $2.80 for regional routes, and $3.25 for express routes. The agency offers reduced rates for eligible "Honored Citizens" who qualify based on age, disability, or Medicare enrollment. Fares can be paid with a Hop Fastpass card, monthly passes, cash, contactless credit and debit cards, and mobile payment platforms such as Apple Pay, Google Pay, and Samsung Pay. Since 2022, all fares for youth riders have been free due to a statewide program.

Transfers to TriMet services are accepted for Hop Fastpass card and contactless payments within a 2.5-hour period. The regional and express fares are charged only when crossing the Columbia River into Portland. The Hop Fastpass system debuted in July 2017 and replaced previous paper transfers used between TriMet and C-Tran's all-zone and express routes.

== Administration ==
C-Tran is officially the Clark County Public Transit Benefit Area Authority, a municipal corporation that is funded by a public transportation benefit area (PTBA) that comprises the urbanized parts of Clark County. The PTBA covers 143 square miles (370 km^{2}) with an estimated population of 465,117 residents in 2026—the fourth most populous PTBA in Washington. The boundaries comprised the entirety of Clark County until 2005. The agency is governed by a board of members with ten members: three Clark County Councilmembers; four members of the Vancouver City Council; two members from the six smaller municipalities in the PTBA; and a non-voting member to represent labor unions. As of 2026, C-Tran has 518 total employees organized into 17 divisions and departments under the leadership of the chief executive officer. Since 2024, the chief executive officer has been Leann M. Caver, a former bus driver and executive within C-Tran.

The agency has an operational budget of $111.6 million for 2026 and expects to have $116.4 million in revenue. Approximately 76 percent of its revenue is derived from a 0.7 percent sales tax levied across the PTBA. Capital projects are primarily funded with a mix of local revenue and grants from the federal and state governments. Under a 2009 state law, C-Tran is permitted to create a separate funding authority from within its PTBA to fund high-capacity transit, such as light rail, with voter approval. The authority would be able to use a sales tax, rental car tax, employer tax, or other sources that are not designated for PTBAs but allowed for regional transit, such as Sound Transit in the Seattle area.

== Fleet ==
As of 2026, C-Tran has 129 buses for fixed route service and 80 vans for paratransit and microtransit. The agency's vehicles traveled a total of 6,327,793 miles (10,183,596 km) in 2025. The first set of 12 diesel–electric hybrid buses were delivered to C-Tran in 2008. The agency adopted plans to have a zero-emissions fleet by 2040 and added nine battery electric buses manufactured by Gillig in 2023. C-Tran has several "community buses" that are wrapped in photographs and designs to reflect local communities in Clark County. They debuted in 2019 and include seven city wraps and an eighth for unincorporated Clark County. The agency used Gillig Phantom buses from 1990 until the complete retirement of the fleet in October 2024; one bus, coach 1776, was retained for use at special events due to its eagle-and-flag livery.

Fixed route fleet (as of 2026)
Manufacturer	Model	Image	Year	Qty.	Length	Seats	Fuel type	Notes
Gillig	Phantom		2003	1	40 ft (12 m)	43	Diesel	Historic bus (no. 1776) used for special events
Gillig	Low Floor		2009	2	35 ft (11 m)	32	Diesel	
Gillig	BRT		2008	12	40 ft (12 m)	36	Diesel–electric	
Gillig	BRT		2008	5	29 ft (9 m)	26	Diesel	
Gillig	BRT		2008	4	35 ft (11 m)	32	Diesel	
Gillig	BRT		2010	3	40 ft (12 m)	39	Diesel	
Gillig	BRT		2010	4	35 ft (11 m)	32	Diesel	
Gillig	BRT		2015	2	29 ft (9 m)	26	Diesel	
Gillig	BRT		2015	16	40 ft (12 m)	39	Diesel–electric	
Gillig	BRT		2016	4	40 ft (12 m)	39	Diesel–electric	
Gillig	BRT		2018	14	40 ft (12 m)	37–39	Diesel–electric	
Gillig	BRT		2019	4	40 ft (12 m)	39	Diesel–electric	
Gillig	BRT		2022	4	40 ft (12 m)	39	Diesel	
Gillig	BRT		2023	6	40 ft (12 m)	39	Diesel	
Gillig	Low Floor Plus EV		2023	10	40 ft (12 m)	39	Electric battery	
New Flyer	Xcelsior		2016	10	60 ft (18 m)	47	Diesel–electric	Used exclusively for The Vine
New Flyer	Xcelsior		2018	2	60 ft (18 m)	54	Diesel–electric	
New Flyer	Xcelsior		2023	8	60 ft (18 m)	47	Diesel	Used exclusively for The Vine
New Flyer	Xcelsior		2025	15	60 ft (18 m)	47	Diesel	Used exclusively for The Vine
Eldorado	Aerotech Cutaway		2008	1	25 ft (8 m)	16	Diesel	Used exclusively for Shopping Shuttle
Eldorado	Aerotech Cutaway		2015	1	25 ft (8 m)	16	Diesel	Used exclusively for Shopping Shuttle
