= Red Line (The Vine) =

Bus rapid transit route in Vancouver, Washington, U.S.

The Vine on Mill Plain
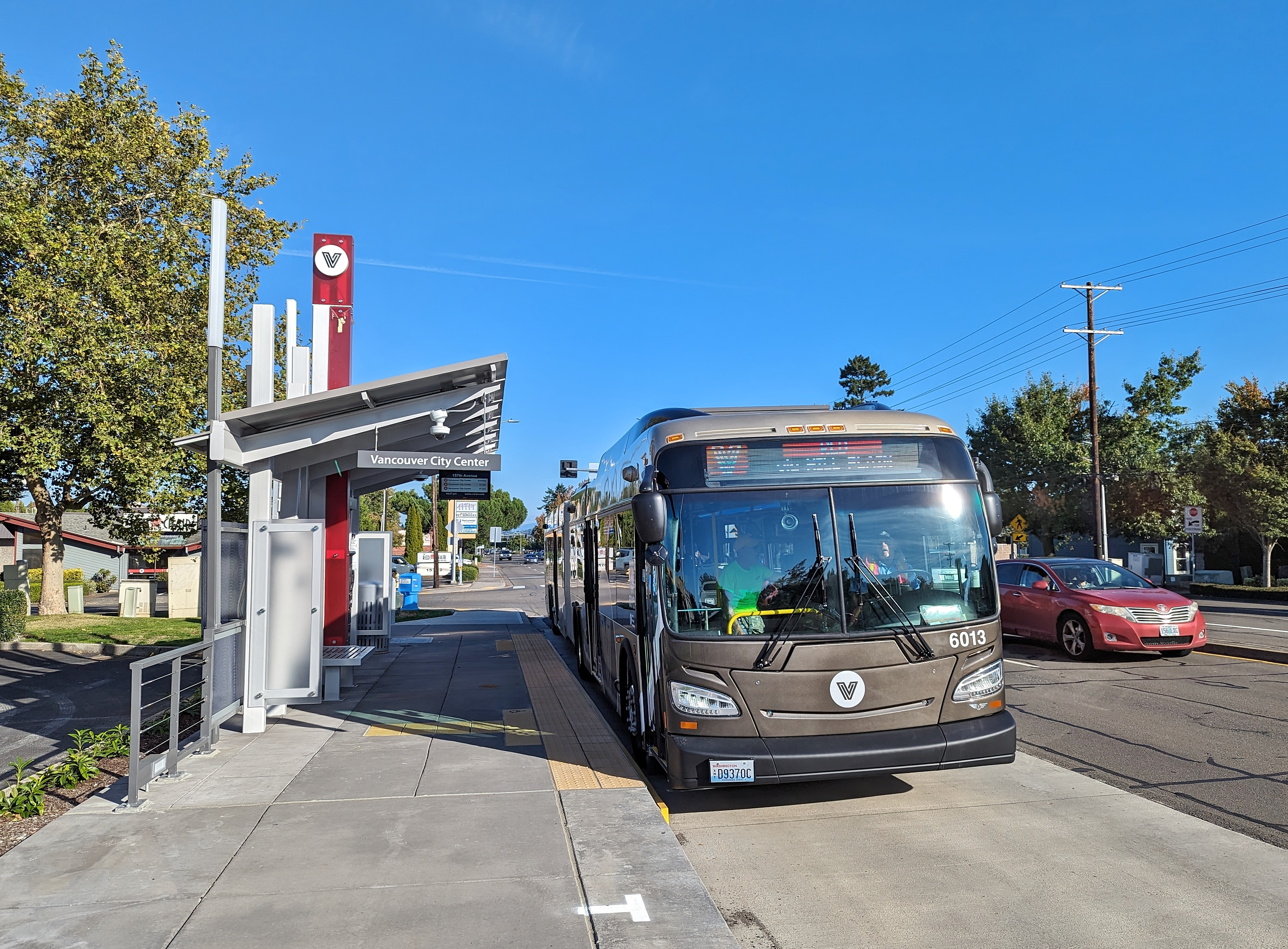
- A westbound Red Line bus at 157th Avenue Station

Overview
- System: The Vine
- Operator: C-Tran
- Status: Open
- Began service: October 1, 2023

Route
- Locale: Vancouver, Washington, U.S.
- Start: Turtle Place, Downtown Vancouver
- Via: Mill Plain Boulevard
- End: Mill Plain Transit Center
- Length: 10 mi (16 km)
- Stations: 37

Service
- Level: Daily
- Annual patronage: 779,861 (2025)

The Red Line, also known as The Vine on Mill Plain, is a bus rapid transit (BRT) line in Vancouver, Washington, United States, operated by C-Tran as part of The Vine. The 10-mile (16 km) route runs from 7th Street at Turtle Place in downtown Vancouver to Mill Plain Transit Center via Mill Plain Boulevard.

Groundbreaking for the Mill Plain BRT project took place on September 28, 2021. A ceremonial ribbon-cutting took place on September 30, 2023, and the line opened for regular service on October 1, 2023. The new line replaced C-Tran Route 37 and features offboard fare payment and near-level boarding.

== History ==
The Southwest Washington Regional Transportation Council (RTC) completed a two-year planning effort to develop a high-capacity transit system for Vancouver and Clark County in 2008. Its High Capacity Transit System Plan, published in a final report that December, identified Mill Plain Boulevard along with three other corridors—Fourth Plain Boulevard, Highway 99, and Interstate 205—as a viable route for BRT. The report predicted a daily ridership of 8,260 riders and a capital cost of $60 million.

C-Tran, Clark County's transit agency, pursued developing the routes in order of highest ridership and adopted a 20-year plan recommending the first BRT line on Fourth Plain Boulevard. The Fourth Plain route, later branded as The Vine, began operating in January 2017. After Fourth Plain Boulevard, C-Tran determined Mill Plain Boulevard was the next busiest corridor with 767,000 passengers recorded on the Route 37 bus service in 2017. Early design and public outreach for the Mill Plain BRT project began in 2018, and four alignment options were presented. C-Tran approved a locally preferred alternative in March 2019.

In 2021, the project received a $24.9 million grant from the Federal Transit Administration to help pay for the project, including the purchase of eight new buses.

C-Tran broke ground for the Mill Plain BRT project on September 28, 2021, at the parking lot behind the Clark College Columbia Tech Center building, the eventual site of the line's eastern terminus. A ribbon-cutting ceremony at the same site was held on September 30, 2023; regular service on the Red Line began the following day.

Due to traffic and physical constraints, the line only launched with an eastbound station at Chkalov Drive. In 2026, C-Tran announced that they would install a platform in the median of Mill Plain Boulevard for westbound buses to serve them, with construction to occur in 2027.

== Route and stations ==
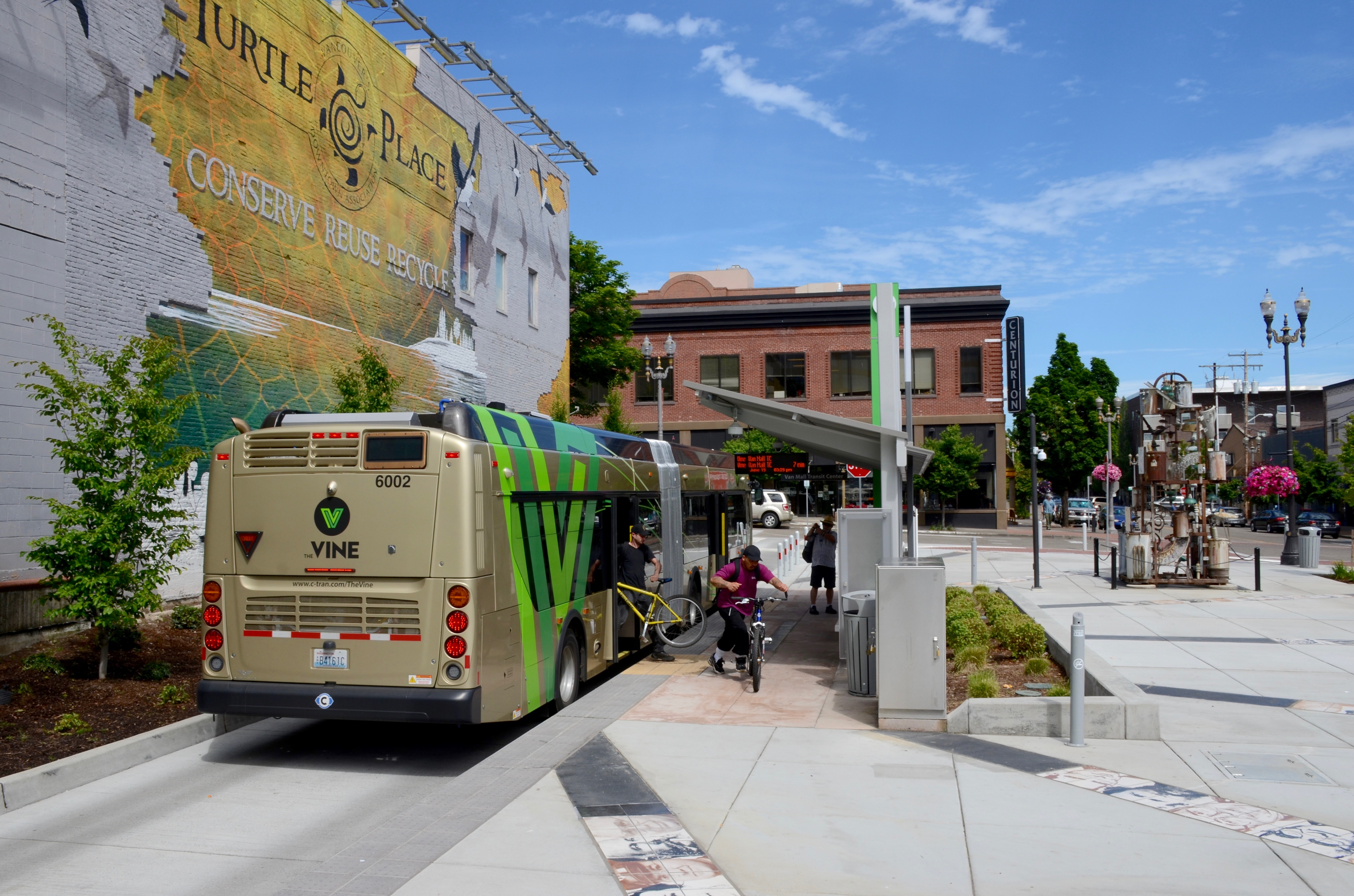
7th Street at Turtle Place, the line's western terminus

The Red Line's western terminus is 7th Street at Turtle Place in downtown Vancouver, where it connects with the Green Line. Between 7th Street and Evergreen Boulevard, buses travel in a one-way pair—southbound on Washington Street and northbound on Broadway Street. The route turns east on Evergreen Boulevard and heads north at Fort Vancouver Way to Mill Plain Boulevard. From Mill Plain Boulevard, the line continues east through to its eastern terminus, Mill Plain Transit Center, near 184th Avenue. The Red Line serves 23 stations.

List of The Vine on Mill Plain stations
Station	Direction(s)	Connections and notes
7th Street at Turtle Place	—	Western terminus; connects with the Green Line
Evergreen & Broadway	Westbound	—
Evergreen & C Street	Eastbound	—
Fort Vancouver Way	Bidirectional	—
Reserve Street	Bidirectional	—
V Street	Bidirectional	—
Grand Boulevard	Bidirectional	—
Brandt Road	Bidirectional	—
Devine Road	Bidirectional	—
Andresen Road	Bidirectional	—
Garrison Road	Bidirectional	—
87th Avenue	Eastbound	—
Mother Joseph Place	Westbound	—
97th Avenue	Bidirectional	—
104th Avenue	Bidirectional	—
Chkalov Drive	Eastbound	—
126th Avenue	Bidirectional	—
136th Avenue	Bidirectional	—
Hearthwood Boulevard	Bidirectional	—
157th Avenue	Bidirectional	—
164th Avenue	Bidirectional	—
Tech Center Drive	Bidirectional	—
Mill Plain Transit Center	—	Eastern terminus
