= Hop Fastpass =

Public transit smart card used in Portland, Oregon

- The standard adult Hop Fastpass card
- Location: Portland metropolitan area
- Launched: July 17, 2017; 8 years ago (Note: Official release date; public beta began in February 2017, and limited availability began on July 5)
- Technology: MIFARE DESFire EV1 256B
- Operator: INIT
- Manager: TriMet
- Currency: USD ($250 maximum load)
- Validity: TriMet; Portland Streetcar; C-Tran
- Website: myhopcard.com

Hop Fastpass is a contactless smart card for public transit fare payment on most transit modes in the Portland metropolitan area including MAX Light Rail, WES commuter rail, Portland Streetcar, The Vine, and all TriMet and C-TRAN buses. An initial release to the general public began on July 5, 2017, with the official launch on July 17. The program is managed by TriMet.

The Hop card is a stored-value contactless smartcard that can hold a cash value or day or monthly passes for various systems. All terminals that read these cards can also accept NFC-based mobile payment systems such as Apple Pay and Google Wallet respectively. A virtual Hop card generated by these platforms is functionally identical to physical cards. Hop also supports fare capping, in which day or month passes are automatically applied when fares reach the respective cost threshold. Passengers must tap on each time they enter the system by holding the card to an electronic reader to validate a pass or deduct funds. Cards can be reloaded using a credit or debit card online, using a mobile app, calling a toll-free number, or at local retailers and ticket offices. Cash can be used when reloading the card in person.

== History ==
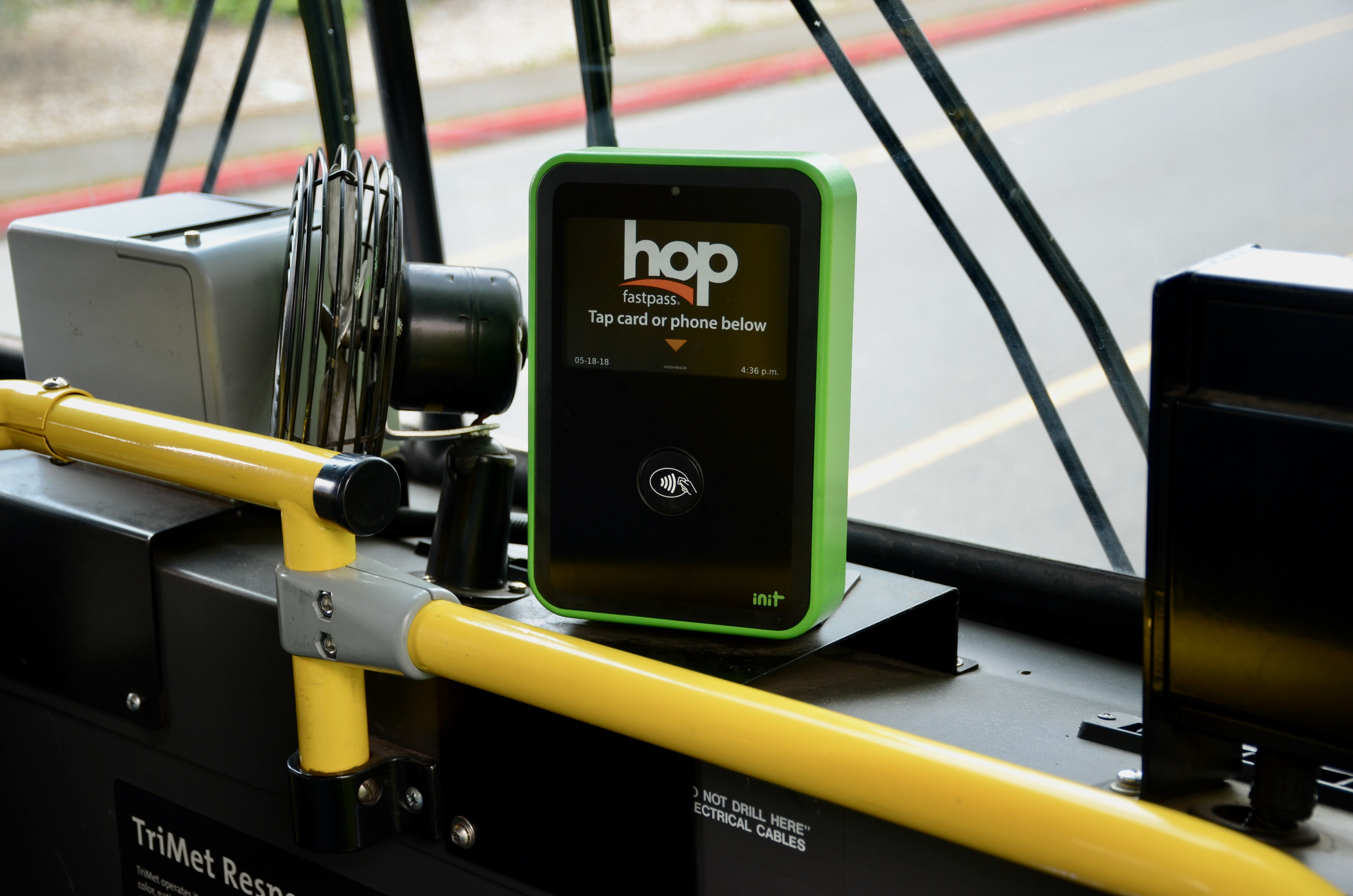
A Hop card reader inside a TriMet bus

Prior to the introduction of electronic payments on the network, paper tickets and passes were used by Portland-area transit agencies. The tickets needed to be validated at ticket validators on the Streetcar or at MAX and WES stations. They did not offer fare exchange or extension. Installation of Hop readers began in March 2015, and was completed by the end of 2016. A public beta began in February 2017.

Hop debuted through a slow rollout at retail stores that began on July 5, 2017, and culminated in an official launch on July 17. The system cost $35.9 million to install and test at the time of its public release. TriMet ceased sales of its paper tickets at retail stores in October 2018 and from its customer service offices the following year. By December 2019, 80.7 percent of TriMet fares were paid using the Hop Fastpass system; of those transactions, only 4 percent used the open payments, while the rest used a card. An existing mobile ticketing app, which launched in 2013, was also shut down in December 2019. Replacement of ticket vending machines at MAX light rail stations with new machines that could dispense Hop Fastpass cards began in November 2024.

== Technology ==
The Hop Card uses ISO 14443-compliant RFID technology allowing the card to be read/written without direct contact. The card uses the NXP/Philips MIFARE DESFire EV1 256B. Hop Card readers can also read information from contactless bank cards and mobile wallets.

== Branding ==
The card's initial design is an ISO 7810 standard-sized purple card, with the Hop logo, and the logos of the three participating transit agencies at the top, and a colored bar at the bottom. The colored bar indicates the type of card: purple for standard adult fares, green for "honored citizen" which includes seniors, low-income riders, and riders with disabilities, and orange for youth cards. Cards also have a hole punched in them for use with a lanyard.

The Hop name was chosen in September 2015, beating out other candidates, including 1Pass, Indigo, Umbrella, Via and Lynx, that were proposed in 2014. Its name references both rabbits and the hops used in craft beers brewed in Portland.

== Use ==
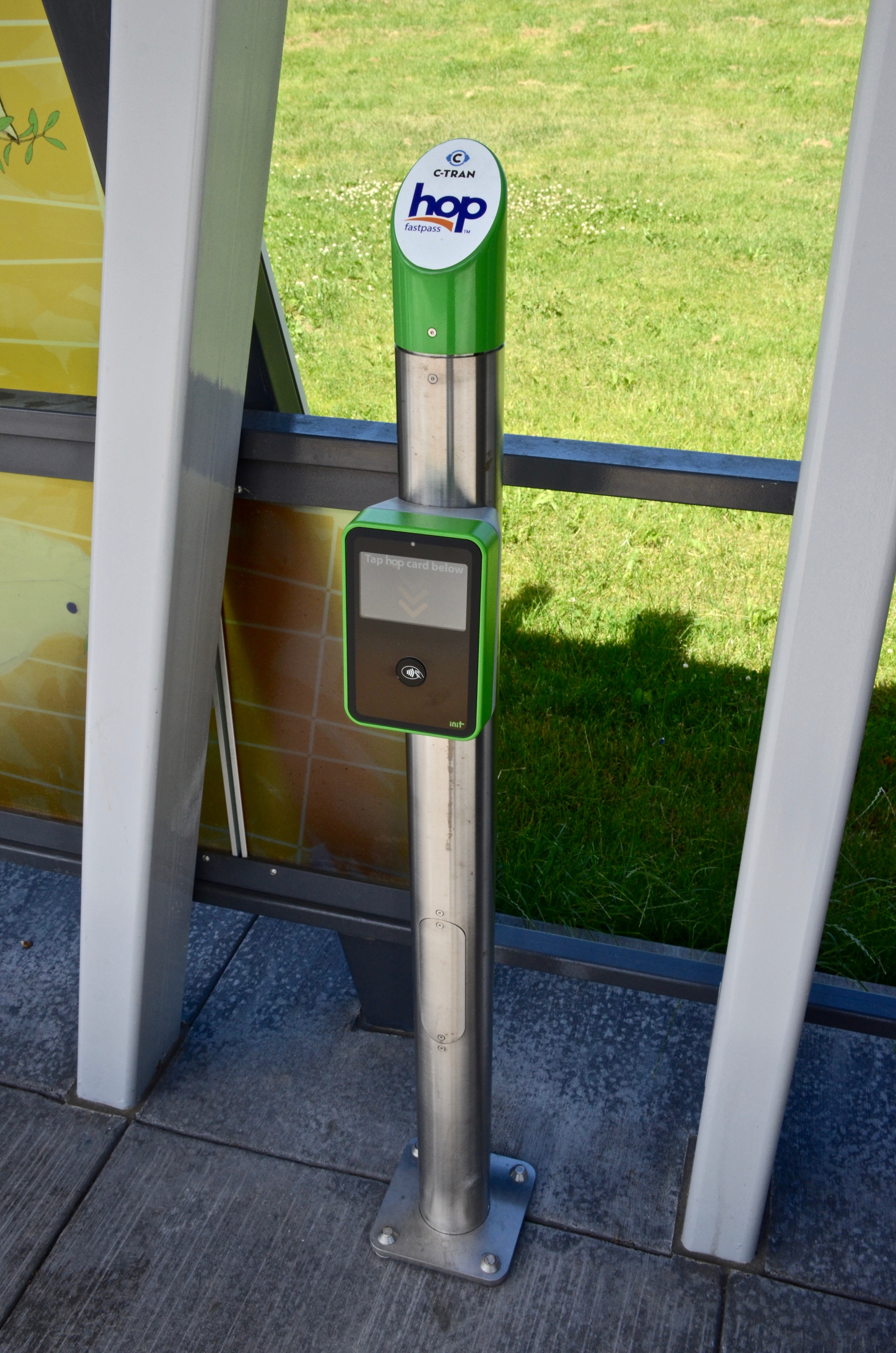
The Hop card readers at C-Tran "The Vine" stations were originally mounted on freestanding posts at stops. Now, the card readers are on board the Vine buses. MAX passengers still must tap their cards at a reader on the platform before boarding.

The card must be tapped each time the system is entered or a transfer is made. It can be tapped on boarding a bus or streetcar, or tapped before boarding the light rail, commuter rail, or BRT. On tapping the card a display shows the time remaining on the current ticket or pass. It also displays any relevant low-balance alerts with an audible sound. There is no penalty for tapping the card more than once within the duration of a ticket. Unlike some systems, there is no need to tap out when leaving the system since fare is the same regardless of the point of exit.

=== Ticketing/pricing ===
The network's fares are time-based rather than distance or segment-based. Tickets are available for unlimited travel over the course of 2.5 hours, one day, one month, or one year. Hop's fare capping system prevents riders from being charged more than the cost of a day pass during one day, or the cost of a monthly pass in the course of a month. This allows riders the benefits of a day or a monthly pass without the upfront cost, or the need to purchase one in advance.

The card can be reloaded online, over the phone, or with the Hop app using a credit or debit card. It can also be reloaded using a credit card or cash anywhere it can be purchased. Hop cards do not expire (except honored citizen cards, which must be renewed every two years). Once a loaded pass expires it can be reloaded with a new one. TriMet has said it projects a card will last 10 years.

=== Mobile wallets ===
On May 21, 2019, TriMet announced that Hop could be added to Google Wallet and Apple Wallet by using the Hop Fastpass app on either Android or iOS. Hop was the first transit card in North America to launch availability in both Google Wallet and Apple Wallet. Virtual Hop cards are functionally identical to their physical counterparts, allowing for the same fare capping rules, and allowing riders to purchase concession fares. Hop also allows riders to convert physical cards onto either mobile payment system.

== See also ==
- List of smart cards
