= Delta Park/Vanport station =

Light rail station in Portland, Oregon, U.S.

Delta Park/Vanport
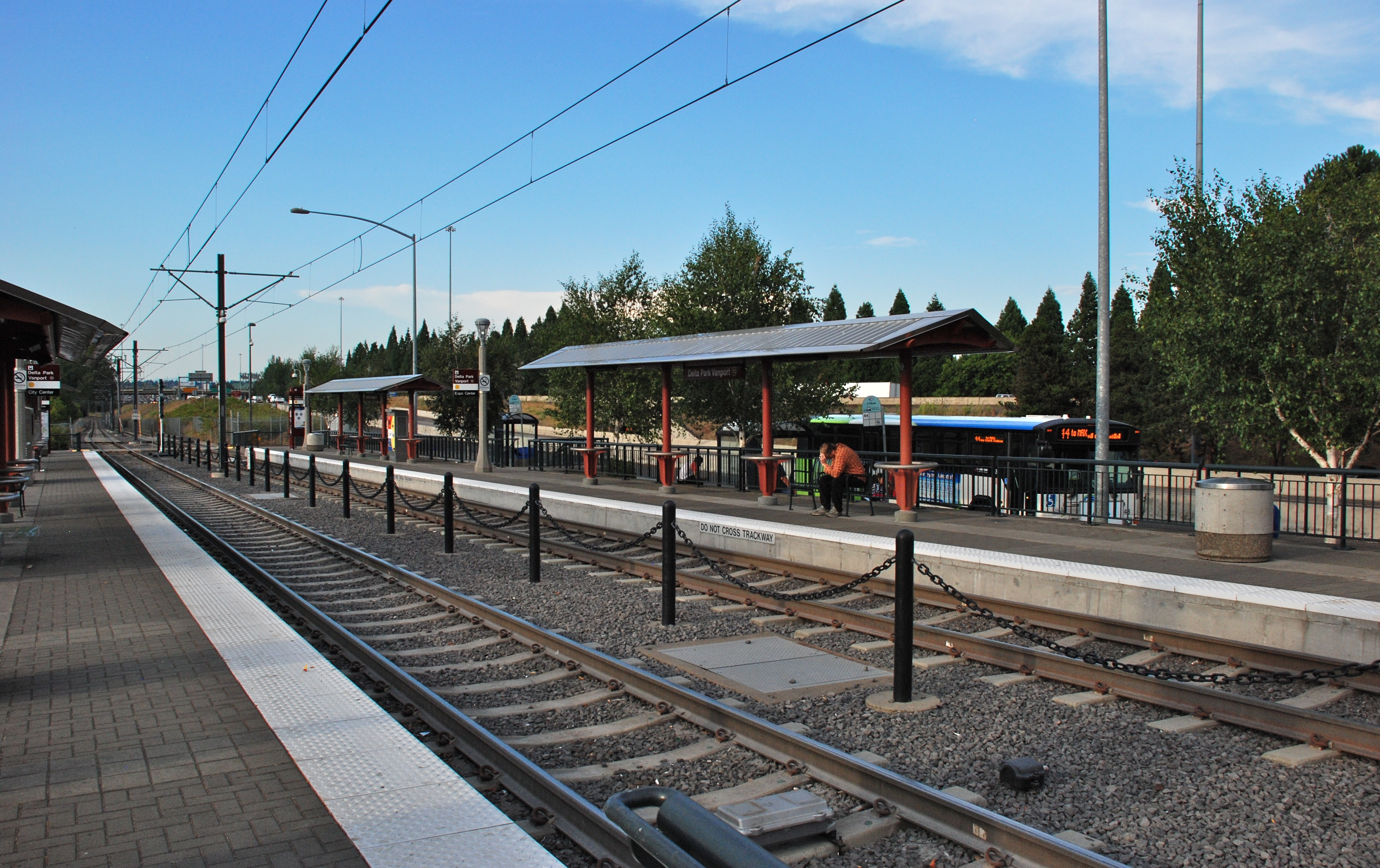
- Looking northeast from the west platform in 2013

General information
- Location: 1490 North Victory Boulevard; Portland, Oregon; U.S.
- Coordinates: 45°35′46″N 122°41′08″W
- Owner: TriMet
- Platforms: side platform
- Tracks: 2
- Connections: C-Tran buses

Construction
- Parking: 304 spaces
- Cycle facilities: Bike lockers
- Accessible: yes

History
- Opened: May 1, 2004

Services
Preceding station	TriMet	Following station
Kenton/North Denver Avenue toward Union Station/NW 5th & Glisan	Yellow Line	Expo Center Terminus
Location

Delta Park/Vanport is a light rail station on the MAX Yellow Line in Portland, Oregon, United States. It is the 9th stop northbound on the Interstate MAX extension and is in the area of Delta Park, formerly the site of the city of Vanport. It is located between Portland International Raceway on the west and Interstate 5 on the east and is at the north end of the Vanport Bridge, which spans the Columbia Slough and an industrial area.

The station platforms are to the sides of the tracks. Beyond them are two park and ride lots to the west and bus bays connected to an I-5 off-ramp to the east. As of 2018, one C-Tran bus route and one TriMet bus route serve this station.

Artwork at the station references the 1948 Vanport Flood, even utilizing bronzed artifacts found on the construction site.

== Bus line connections ==
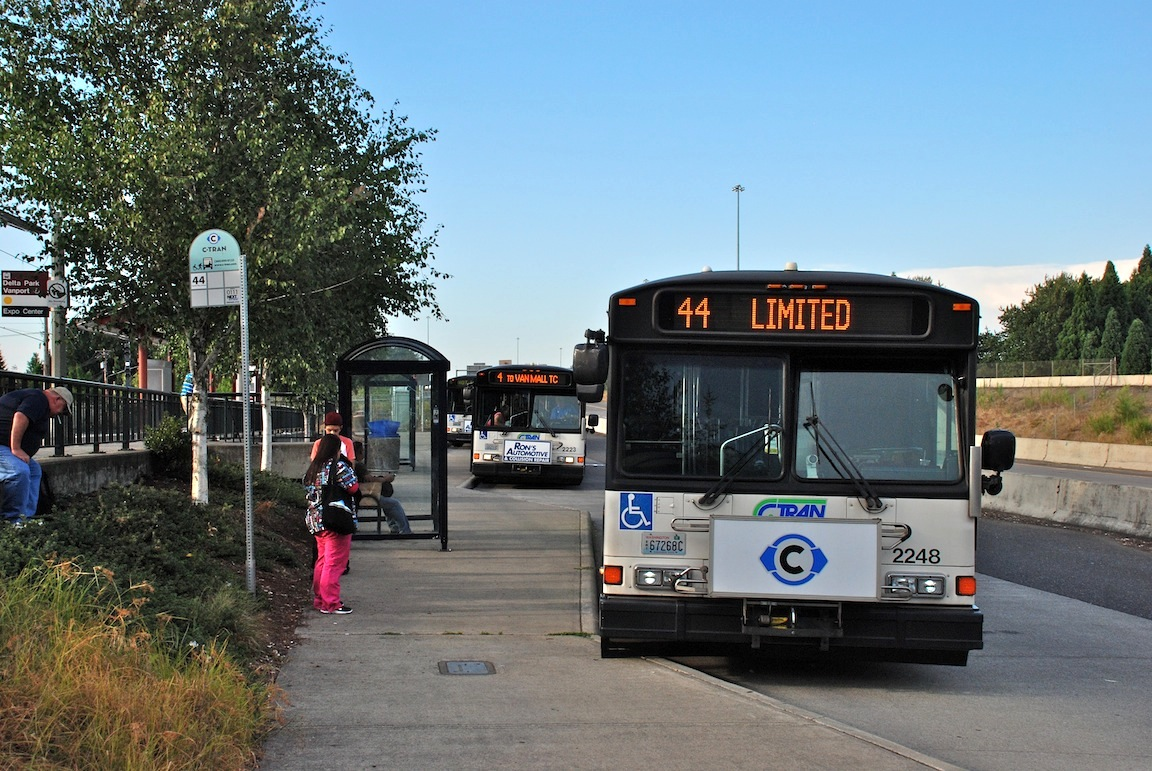
Three C-Tran buses at the station

As of August 2026, Delta Park/Vanport MAX station is served by three bus routes:

- TriMet route 6 - Martin Luther King Jr. Blvd. (southbound trips only)
- TriMet route 293 - Yellow Bus (late night MAX)
- C-Tran route 60 - Delta Park Limited (operating all day, seven days a week)

=== Bus service history ===
When the station opened in 2004, there was no regular bus service to it; however, C-Tran did use the bus bays during winter storms instead of providing through service to downtown Portland. In 2007, C-Tran began regularly serving the station for the first time. Three limited-stop "commuter" (rush hours only) routes (41, 44 and 47) served the station starting in May 2007, connecting it with Vancouver and other points in Clark County. Another route was added in September 2007, prompted by TriMet's discontinuation, on September 2 of that year, of the portion of its route 6-ML King Blvd between Jantzen Beach and downtown Vancouver. C-Tran began operating a temporary shuttle between Delta Park/Vanport MAX station and downtown Vancouver, replacing it with permanent service – with a regular, all-day route (4-Fourth Plain) – in November 2007.

Routes 4-Fourth Plain and 44-Fourth Plain Limited stopped serving the station in September 2016, and route 47-Battle Ground Limited's service to the station was discontinued in September 2017.

TriMet bus service (route 6, southbound trips only) to this station was introduced in September 2017.

TriMet bus service (route 293, night bus) was introduced in August 2024 in place of the MAX.. As of August 2026, the route has changed to serve N Expo Rd instead of N Columbia Blvd, Portland Rd, and Marine Dr for faster trips to Delta Park/Vanport MAX station.
