= Southwest Washington Regional Transportation Council =

Metropolitan planning organization

The Southwest Washington Regional Transportation Council (SWRTC) is the metropolitan planning organization for southwestern Washington state, including parts of the Portland, Oregon metropolitan area. It oversees long-range planning and transportation funding for Clark, Klickitat, and Skamania counties. SWRTC was established in 1992 under the provisions of the 1990 Washington State Growth Management Act.
