= Vancouver Mall =

Shopping mall in Vancouver, Washington, US

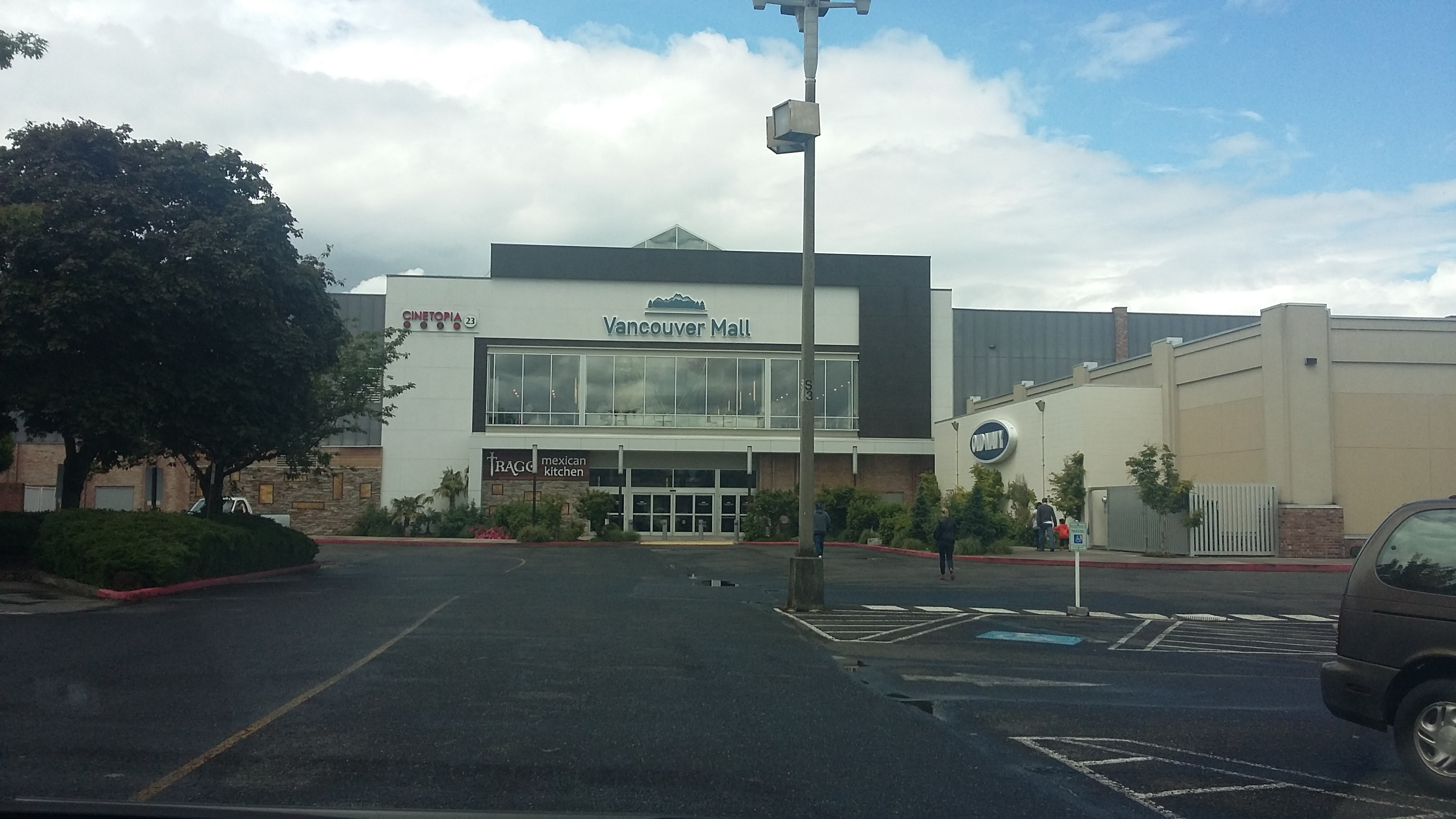
- Mall entrance
- Location: Vancouver, Washington, U.S.
- Coordinates: 45°39′29″N 122°35′1″W
- Address: 8700 N.E. Vancouver Mall Drive
- Opened: August 17, 1977
- Developer: May Centers, Inc.
- Manager: Centennial Real Estate
- Owner: Centennial Real Estate Co.
- Architect: Nelson/Walla/Dolle & Company
- Num. of stores: 122 as of June 2020
- Num. of anchor tenants: 7
- Floor area: 883,000 square feet (82,000 m^{2})
- Floors: 2
- Parking: 4,250 Parking Spaces
- Website: shopvancouvermall.com

Vancouver Mall is a shopping mall owned by Cenntenial Real Estate, and located in the city of Vancouver, Washington, U.S., which is within the Portland metropolitan area. It is anchored by Gold's Gym, H&M, JCPenney, Macy's, AMC, Hobby Lobby, Round One, and Old Navy. Longtime past anchor stores included Meier & Frank, Sears, Nordstrom and Mervyn's. Opened in August 1977, Vancouver Mall is located near an interchange between Interstate 205 and State Route 500.

== History ==
Plans for the mall were announced by California-based developer Newman Properties and St. Louis-based May Centers in December 1972. At the price of $50 million, Vancouver Mall would be a fully-enclosed structure, comprising two retail levels, at the intersection of then-unfinished Interstate 205 and State Route 500. It would be constructed in two phases.

Vancouver Mall opened in August 17, 1977, with Meier & Frank, Nordstrom and Sears as anchors. During phase two of mall expansion, a JCPenney was added. A Lipman's was also planned, but was not built. Eventually, Mervyns would open where the Lipman's had been planned. A 50-foot oak tree was planted on the southwest side of the property to commemorate the grand opening. This tree still exists to this day.

While the mall is now located within the Vancouver city limits, until 1993 the property was in an unincorporated part of Clark County.

In 1993, the mall added a new food court and underwent a renovation of its interior. The mall was sold by May Centers in 1994 to Westfield America, Inc after all 19 of the remaining May owned malls were sold to Westfield.

In 1998, the mall was renamed "Westfield Shoppingtown Vancouver", at which time the mall had 146 stores using 870,000 square feet (81,000 m^{2}) of space. However, "Shoppingtown" was dropped from the name in September 2005, making it Westfield Vancouver. However, most shoppers and Vancouverites continued to refer to it as "Vancouver Mall".

2003 would see a full interior and minor exterior renovations to the Sears store at the mall. In mid-2005, work was started on a 60,000-square-foot (5,600 m^{2}) expansion to the Meier & Frank store by its then-owner, the May Department Stores Company, adding 30,000 square feet on each of two levels, completed in 2006. Following the acquisition of the May Company by Federated Department Stores, the Meier & Frank store was renamed Macy's in September 2006.

The 82,225-square-foot (7,639.0 m^{2}) Mervyn's closed in January 2007. On June 1, 2012, it was converted to the Cinetopia "Vancouver Mall 23" video movie theater. In 2009, Westfield looked into expanding the mall. These plans would have demolished the former Mervyn's and added additional retail space. By this point the mall was 17% vacant. Prior to this, Westfield intended to add a lifestyle district to the southwest corner of the property. Neither of these plans came into fruition.

In 2011, plans were announced for another renovation of the mall, the third since opening in 1977. These renovations included new floors, lighting, exterior entrances, escalators, and new tenants. Renovations were completed in July 2012. Cinetopia opened their new multiplex cinema just a month after renovations were finished.

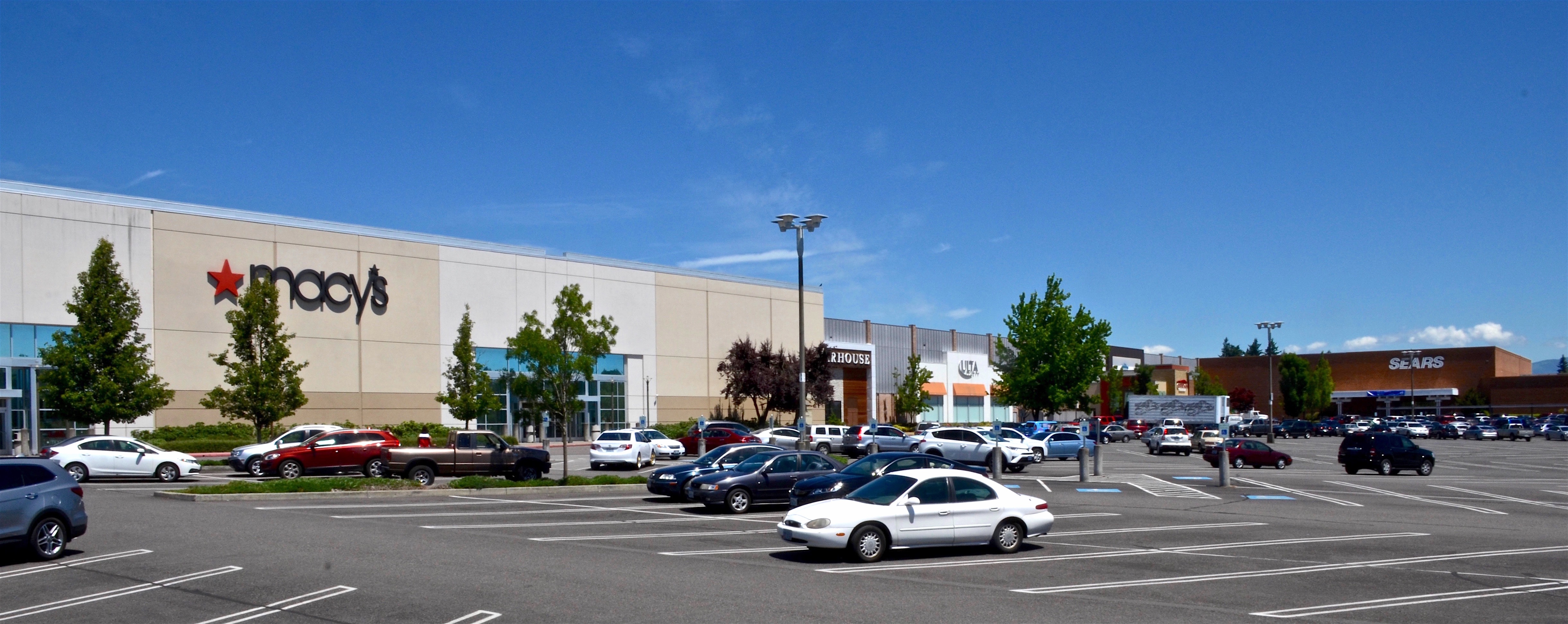
The mall from the southwest in 2017

In February 2014, it was announced that Nordstrom would be closing its store at the mall. The store closed in January 2015, at which time the mall managers announced that Gold's Gym would move into the upper level and H&M would move into the lower level of the former-Nordstrom space.

In 2015, Sears Holdings spun off 235 of its properties, including the Sears at Westfield Vancouver, into Seritage Growth Properties.

On December 18, 2015, Vancouver Mall along with some other U.S. Westfield properties were sold to Centennial Real Estate Company. Vancouver Mall was sold to Centennial for 45 million dollars. "Westfield" was removed from the mall's name. Any other references to Westfield online or at the property were removed the same day. Mall management was retained.

On August 22, 2018, Sears announced that its store would also be closing as part of a plan to close 46 stores nationwide. The store officially closed after 41 years on November 25, 2018 After the store closed, Macy's, JCPenney, Gold's Gym, Old Navy, Cinetopia, and H&M are the remaining anchors left.

In March 2019, it was announced that Hobby Lobby and Round One Entertainment would move into the vacant Sears space. Construction on the Round One and Hobby Lobby commenced in September 2019 with an estimated opening date of August 2020. This date was pushed back to September 2020 due to COVID-19 pandemic related construction delays. Hobby Lobby opened its doors on September 14, 2020. Round One hosted its grand opening on April 3, 2021. In 2022, Sephora opened a second mall location inside the former Sears auto center. This comes after Sephora and JCPenney ended their exclusive partnership in December 2020. Also in the former Sears, FitNation plans to open a gym branch in the space in 2022. The Sears building and its respective land were sold to Allen Properties of Oregon in 2022.

Shoe Dept. Encore opened a 15,000 square foot store in April 2019. On May 23, 2019, AMC Theatres purchased the Cinetopia theater chain. All Cinetopia locations including the Vancouver Mall theater were rebranded under AMC. In June, Chick-fil-A and Five Guys announced plans to open in a freestanding building in the malls southwest parking lot. Five Guys opened on September 9, 2020, with Chick-Fil-A opening on January 7, 2021.

On March 17, 2020, the mall temporarily closed due to the COVID-19 pandemic, with an estimated re-opening in June. Select retailers began offering curbside pickup in late May. All ongoing construction projects at the mall were put on hold due to governor Jay Inslees pandemic related halt to all construction. This ban was lifted the next month. On June 8, 2020, the Vancouver Mall announced they would be reopening on the 10th with restrictions and new safety measures in place to combat the spread of COVID-19.

Beginning in 2020, the mall lost many national retailers. Those included: Michael Kors, GNC, The Walking Company, Kay Jewelers, Aveda, The Children's Place, Gymboree, Charlotte Russe, Christopher & Banks, Justice, Starbucks, Aldo, Loft, Aeropostale, and See's Candies. National retailers that have joined the mall in the 2020s are Tillys, Windsor, Sephora, The Good Feet Store, Hobby Lobby, Round1, Carter's, Hollister Co., MINISO and BoxLunch.

On October 6, 2020, the mall announced that it would embark on another interior renovation. These minor renovations include new carpets, new seating areas, and small cosmetic changes throughout the property.

On October 31, 2024, during a Halloween trick-or-treat event, the mall was the subject of a shooting in the food court by a masked gunman. Due to the Halloween event, there were more people at the mall than usual; 82 calls were made to 911, the first call being at 7:27pm. One person, 26-year-old James Perez was killed, while two others were injured with non-fatal injuries. The Vancouver Police Department later identified the shooter as 32-year-old Travis Ward, and called the shooting a targeted attack.

The coming and going of national retailers continued into 2025, with the loss of Forever 21 and Francesca's after both chains went defunct, as well as FYE and Orange Julius. But the addition of Pandora, JD Sports, and the return of Kay Jewelers after their closure in 2020.
