= Red Line =

Red Line or Redline may refer to:

== Arts and entertainment ==
=== Films ===
- Red Line (1959 film), a Finnish film based on the 1909 novel
- The Red Line (1982 film), an Iranian film directed by Masoud Kimiai
- Red Line (1996 film), an American crime drama
- Redline (1997 film) or Deathline, a Canadian-Dutch science fiction film
- The Thin Red Line (1998 film), an American war film
- Redline (2007 film), an American action film
- Redline (2009 film), a Japanese anime film
- Red Line (2012 film), an American terrorist thriller
- Red Line, a 2023 Taiwanese action romantic film starring Ella Chen and Alan Ko

=== Music ===
- The Red Line, a 1978 opera by Aulis Sallinen based on the 1909 novel
- Red Line (album), by Trans Am, 2000
- "Red Line", by 5 Seconds of Summer song from 5SOS5
- "Red Line (For TA)", a 2009 song by Ayumi Hamasaki, a B-side of "You Were..."
- Redline (EP), by Seventh Day Slumber, 2015

=== Video games ===
- Redline (1999 video game), a first-person shooter/car combat game for Windows
- Street Legal Racing: Redline, a 2003 Windows game
- Redline (2006 video game), a racing game for Mac OS X

=== Other media ===
- The Red Line, a 1909 Finnish novel by Ilmari Kianto on which a film and opera are based
- The Red Line (TV series), a 2019 American drama series

== Brands and enterprises ==
- Redline (bicycle brand), an American bicycle manufacturer
- Redline Coaches, a Tasmanian bus company
- Redline Communications, a Canadian company
- Redline Energy Drink, from Bang Energy
- Redline Records, an Australian record label
- Red Line Synthetic Oil Corporation, an oil manufacturer for automotive and other performance applications
- Redline yachts, a series produced by C&C Yachts

== Public transit ==
Many bus, rail, subway, and tram lines around the world are either officially or colloquially named the "Red Line". These include:

=== Africa ===
- Red line (Lagos Transit), Nigeria

=== Asia ===
- Red Lines (Bangkok), Thailand
  - Dark Red Line (Bangkok)
  - Light Red Line (Bangkok)
- Red Line, Chiang Mai light rail transit, Thailand
- Red Line (Doha Metro), Qatar
- Red Line (Dubai Metro), United Arab Emirates
- Line 5 (Chennai Metro), India
- Red Line (Delhi Metro), India
- Red Line (Hyderabad Metro), India
- Red Line (Mumbai Metro), India
- Red Line (Lucknow Metro), India
- Red Line (Namma Metro), Bengaluru, India
- Bogor Line of KRL Commuterline, Jakarta, Indonesia
- North–South Line (Jakarta MRT), Jakarta, Indonesia
- Red line (Kaohsiung MRT), Taiwan
- Line 1 (Beijing Subway), China
- Line 1 (Shanghai Metro), China
- Line 5 (Guangzhou Metro), China
- Midōsuji Line, Osaka, Japan
- North–South Line (Singapore)
- Tamsui–Xinyi line, Taipei, Taiwan
- Tokyo Metro Marunouchi Line, Tokyo, Japan
- Tsuen Wan line, Hong Kong
- Line 1 (Daegu Metro), South Korea
- Shinbundang Line, Seoul, South Korea
- Red Line (Jerusalem Light Rail), Jerusalem, Israel
- Red Line (Tel Aviv Light Rail), Tel Aviv, Israel
- Line 2 (Riyadh Metro), Riyadh, Saudi Arabia

=== Europe ===
- Red Line (Luas), Dublin, Ireland, a tram line
- Red Line (Stockholm Metro), Sweden
- Line 2 (Athens Metro), Greece
- Aŭtazavodskaja line, Minsk, Belarus
- Barcelona Metro line 1, Spain
- Central line (London Underground), England
- Windrush line, service operated by London Overground, England
- Leninskaya Line, Novosibirsk, Russia
- Line 1 (Kharkiv Metro) aka Kholodnohirsko–Zavodska line, Ukraine
- Line 1 (Saint Petersburg Metro), Russia
- Line 2 (Madrid Metro), Spain
- Line C (Prague Metro), Czech Republic
- Lyon Metro Line A, Lyon, France
- Milan Metro Line 1, Italy
- RER A, Paris, France
- Sviatoshynsko–Brovarska line, Kyiv, Ukraine
- Sokolnicheskaya line, Moscow, Russia
- Tyne and Wear Metro of Newcastle upon Tyne, UK (former line)
- Red Line (Lisbon Metro), Portugal
- U2 (Berlin U-Bahn), Germany

=== North America ===
==== Canada ====
- Red Line (Calgary), Alberta
- Red Line (Montreal Metro) (proposed)

==== Mexico ====
- Red Line (Mexico City Metro)
- Red Line (Mexico City Metrobús)
- Line 1 of the Guadalajara urban rail system, Guadalajara

==== United States ====
- Red Line (Baltimore), Maryland Transit Administration, Maryland (Proposed)
- Red Line (CTA), Chicago, Illinois
- Red Line (DART), Texas
- Red Line (IndyGo), Indianapolis Public Transportation Corporation, Indianapolis, Indiana
- Red Line (MARTA) (formerly North-South Line), Atlanta, Georgia
- Red Line (MBTA), Boston, Massachusetts
- Red Line (Pittsburgh), Port Authority, Pennsylvania
- Red Line (RTA Rapid Transit), Greater Cleveland Regional Transit Authority, Ohio
- Red Line (Sound Transit), Seattle, Washington
- Red Line (St. Louis MetroLink), Bi-State Development Agency, Missouri
- Red Line (TRAX), Utah Transit Authority, Salt Lake City area
- Red Line (Washington Metro), WMATA, Washington, D.C.
- Red Line (The Vine), a bus rapid transit line in Vancouver, Washington
- Baltimore Light RailLink for Penn Station – Camden Yards Line aka Red Line, Maryland Transit Administration, Baltimore, Maryland
- B Line (Los Angeles Metro), California, until 2020 formerly named the "Red Line"
- Capital MetroRail, Austin, Texas
- F Line (RTD), aka Red Line, Regional Transportation District, Denver, Colorado
- IRT Broadway–Seventh Avenue Line in New York City, colored red, serving the 1, 2, and 3 trains
- Lynx Red Line, North Carolina
- MAX Red Line, Tri-Met, Portland, Oregon
- Metro Red Line (Minnesota), METRO/Minnesota Valley Transit Authority, suburban Minneapolis, Minnesota area
- METRORail Red Line, Houston, Texas
- PATCO Speedline, Philadelphia, Pennsylvania
- Rapid Ride Route 766 Red Line, ABQ RIDE, Albuquerque, New Mexico
- Red Line (BART), Bay Area Rapid Transit, San Francisco Bay Area, California
- Special Event Line (San Diego Trolley), SDMTS, San Diego, California
- T Third Street, MUNI, San Francisco, California
- Valley Metro Rail, aka METRO Light Rail Red Line, Phoenix, Arizona

=== Oceania ===
- Central Coast & Newcastle Line, New South Wales, Australia
- T9 Northern Line, Australia

=== South America ===
- Line 3 (São Paulo Metro), São Paulo, Brazil
- Red Line (Rio de Janeiro), Brazil, an expressway

== Other uses ==
- Document redlining, the process of comparing two documents
- Red line (phrase), a figurative phrase used in English and Hebrew meaning a limit past which something shouldn't cross safely
  - Red lines in the Russo-Ukrainian War
- Red line (hockey), the center of the playing surface on an ice hockey rink
- Red Line (Namibia), a pest-exclusion fence separating Northern Namibia from the central and southern parts
- Red Line, the military line of defense in Operation Manta, along the 15th and later 16th parallel north, of the Chadian-Libyan Conflict
- All Red Line, a network of telegraph cables linking the British Empire
- Red Line Agreement, an agreement signed by partners in the Turkish Petroleum Company in 1928
- Red Line, Iowa, an unincorporated community
- Operation Red Line, a planned Indian military operation
- Redlining, a discriminatory practice in the US
- Redline (engines)

== See also ==
- The Thin Red Line (disambiguation)
- The Red Telephone (disambiguation)
- Red route
- Punainen viiva (disambiguation)

Aqua Line (disambiguation)
Black line (disambiguation)
Blue Line (disambiguation)
Light Blue Line (disambiguation)
Brown Line (disambiguation)
Gold Line (disambiguation)
Gray Line (disambiguation)
Green Line (disambiguation)
Light Green Line (disambiguation)
Magenta Line (disambiguation)
Orange Line (disambiguation)
Pink Line (disambiguation)
Purple Line (disambiguation)
Red Line (disambiguation)
Silver Line (disambiguation)
Teal Line (disambiguation)
Turquoise Line (disambiguation)
Violet Line (disambiguation)
White Line (disambiguation)
Yellow Line (disambiguation)
