= White Line =

White line(s) may refer to:

== Music ==
=== Albums ===
- White Line (album), by Memorain, 2003

=== Songs ===
- "White Line" (Emmylou Harris song), 1985
- "White Line", a song by Neil Young and Crazy Horse from the 1990 album Ragged Glory
- "White Lines (Don't Don't Do It)", a 1983 song by Melle Mel
- "White Lines", a 2019 song by Rick Ross from the album Port of Miami 2
- "White Lines", a 2026 song by Kanye West from the album Bully

== Film and television ==
- The White Line (1950 film), an Italian drama film by Luigi Zampa
- The White Line (2019 film), a Namibian drama romantic history film
- White Lines (TV series), a 2020 British-Spanish mystery thriller streaming on Netflix
- "White Lines" (Cloak & Dagger), an episode of Cloak & Dagger

== Transportation ==
- White Line (Long Island Rail Road), a 19th-century line in Queens County, New York, U.S.
- White Line (Montreal Metro), an unbuilt line in Montreal, Canada
- White Line (New Jersey Transit), a rail line in New Jersey, U.S., now the Meadowlands Rail Line
- White Diamond Line, a North Atlantic packet service
- White Star Line, a British shipping company
- White lines, a reference to road surface markings
- Whitelining or lane splitting, riding between lines of traffic

== Other uses ==
- White line, the Vatican-Italy border, painted for Hugh O'Flaherty
- White line, part of a horse hoof
  - White line disease, a fungal infection of the horse's hoof
- Hilton white line or anocutaneous line, a boundary in the anal canal

== See also ==
- White line fever (disambiguation)

Aqua Line (disambiguation)
Black line (disambiguation)
Blue Line (disambiguation)
Light Blue Line (disambiguation)
Brown Line (disambiguation)
Gold Line (disambiguation)
Gray Line (disambiguation)
Green Line (disambiguation)
Light Green Line (disambiguation)
Magenta Line (disambiguation)
Orange Line (disambiguation)
Pink Line (disambiguation)
Purple Line (disambiguation)
Red Line (disambiguation)
Silver Line (disambiguation)
Teal Line (disambiguation)
Turquoise Line (disambiguation)
Violet Line (disambiguation)
White Line (disambiguation)
Yellow Line (disambiguation)
