= Blue Line =

Blue Line or Blueline may refer to:

== Transportation ==
=== Africa ===
- Blue Line (Lagos Transit), Lagos, Nigeria
- Blue Line, part of the Abuja Light Rail Network in Abuja, Nigeria

=== Asia ===
==== China ====
- Line 2 (Beijing Subway), Beijing
- East Rail line, Hong Kong
- Island line (MTR), Hong Kong

==== India ====
- Blue Line (Namma Metro), Bengaluru
- Blue Line (Chennai Metro), Chennai
- Blue Line (Delhi Metro), Delhi
- Blue Line (Hyderabad Metro), Hyderabad
- Blue Line (Kolkata Metro), Kolkata
- Blue Line (Lucknow Metro), Lucknow
- Blue Line (Mumbai Metro), Mumbai

==== South Korea ====
- Busan Metro Line 4, Busan
- Seoul Subway Line 1, Dark Blue Line, Seoul
- Seoul Subway Line 4, Light Blue Line, Seoul

==== Taiwan ====
- Blue line (Taichung MRT), Taichung
- Bannan line, Taipei

==== Others ====
- Blue Line (Bangkok), Bangkok, Thailand
- Blue Line (Dubai Metro), Dubai
- Cibubur Line of Jabodebek LRT, Jakarta, Indonesia
- MRT Line 3 (Metro Manila), known as Blue Line before 2012, Manila, Philippines
- Line 1 (Riyadh Metro), Blue Line, Riyadh, Saudi Arabia
- Downtown Line, Singapore
- Blue Line (Yokohama), also called Lines 1 & 3, Yokohama, Japan
- Blue Line (Jerusalem Light Rail)

=== Europe ===
- Blue Line (airline), based in France
- Blue Line (Lisbon Metro), Portugal
- Blue Line (Stockholm Metro), Sweden
- Blue Line International, a former ferry service in the Adriatic Sea
- Barcelona Metro line 5, often called "Línia Blava" (Blue Line), Barcelona, Spain
- Barcelona Metro line 6, Barcelona, Spain
- Paris Metro Line 2, Paris, France
- Piccadilly line, London, England
- Sheffield Supertram Blue Line, United Kingdom
- Tyne and Wear Metro of Newcastle upon Tyne, UK (Former line)
- Victoria line, London, England

=== North America ===
==== Canada ====
- Blue Line (Calgary), Calgary, Alberta
- Blue Line (Montreal Metro), Montreal, Quebec
- Line 4 (O-Train), the Airport Link of Ottawa's O-Train (Line 4)
- Line 3 Scarborough, Toronto, Ontario
- Viva Blue, York Region, Ontario

==== Mexico ====
- Blue Line (Mexico City Metro)
- Blue Line (Mexico City Metrobús)

==== United States ====
===== California =====
- A Line (Los Angeles Metro), Los Angeles County
- Blue Line (SacRT), Sacramento
- Blue Line (San Diego Trolley), San Diego
- Blue Line (BART), San Francisco Bay Area
- N Judah, a Muni Metro light rail line in San Francisco

===== New York City =====
- The Harlem Line of the Metro-North Railroad
- The Hoboken–33rd Street route of the PATH Train
- Any of the New York City Subway services that use the IND Eighth Avenue Line and its branches:
  - A Eighth Avenue Express
  - C Eighth Avenue Local
  - E Eighth Avenue Local
  - The former K Eighth Avenue Local
  - The Rockaway Park Shuttle, which formerly contained a blue route bullet
- The Port Jefferson Branch of the Long Island Rail Road
- The former JFK Express of the New York City Subway
- The future T Second Avenue Local of the New York City Subway
- The West Hempstead Branch of the Long Island Rail Road
- The Staten Island Railway

===== Other =====
- ARTx Blue Line, formerly Rapid Ride, Albuquerque, New Mexico
- Blue Line (MARTA), Atlanta, Georgia
- Blue Line (CapMetro), Austin, Texas
- Blue Line (MBTA), Boston, Massachusetts
- Lynx Blue Line, Charlotte, North Carolina
- Blue Line (CTA), Chicago, Illinois
- Blue Line (RTA Rapid Transit) (light rail), Cleveland, Ohio
- Blue Line (DART), Dallas, Texas
- Trinity Railway Express, Dallas, Texas
- H Line (RTD), Denver, Colorado
- Metro Blue Line (Minnesota), Minneapolis, Minnesota
- Atlantic City Line, a commuter rail line New Jersey
- Grove Street – Newark Penn, a light rail line in Newark, New Jersey
- North Jersey Coast Line, a commuter rail line New Jersey
- Blue Line (Pittsburgh), Pittsburgh, Pennsylvania
- Market–Frankford Line, Philadelphia, Pennsylvania
- MAX Blue Line, Portland, Oregon
- Blue Line (St. Louis MetroLink), St. Louis, Missouri
- Blue Line (Sound Transit), a proposed extension in Seattle, Washington
- Swift Blue Line, Snohomish County, Washington
- Blue Line (TRAX), a light rail line in the Salt Lake City, Utah area
- Blue Line (Washington Metro), Washington, DC
- Tomorrowland Transit Authority PeopleMover, Walt Disney World, Florida

=== Oceania ===
- T4 Eastern Suburbs & Illawarra Line, Sydney, Australia
- T2 Leppington & Inner West Line, Sydney, Australia
- South Coast Line, New South Wales, Australia

=== South America ===
- Line 1 (São Paulo Metro), São Paulo, Brazil

== Other ==
- Blue Line (album), by Yae
- Blue line (ice hockey), the line between center ice and each team's zone
- Blue Line (withdrawal line), the UN drawn demarcation line dividing Lebanon from Israel and the Golan Heights
- Blue Line (New York State), delineates the Adirondack and Catskill parks of New York's Forest Preserve
- BlueLine Grid, a mobile communications platform that connects civil service employees
- Blueline, a 2019 EP by twlv
- The "blue line", mark on an airspeed indicator for a multi-engine aircraft
- The blue-line printing process for copying using the diazo chemical process, also known as whiteprint
- The Blueline Blaster, nickname of Hy Buller (1926–1968), All Star NHL ice hockey player
- Blue line, a diagram in method ringing which shows the structure of a method
- Blue-line stream, year-round streams that are typically denoted on maps with solid blue lines
- "Blue Lines", a song by the American band Bright from the album Full Negative (or) Breaks

== See also ==
- Blue belt (disambiguation)
- Blue Route (disambiguation)
- Blue Star Line
- Blue Train (disambiguation)
- Long Blue Line (disambiguation)
- The Thin Blue Line (disambiguation)

Aqua Line (disambiguation)
Black line (disambiguation)
Blue Line (disambiguation)
Light Blue Line (disambiguation)
Brown Line (disambiguation)
Gold Line (disambiguation)
Gray Line (disambiguation)
Green Line (disambiguation)
Light Green Line (disambiguation)
Magenta Line (disambiguation)
Orange Line (disambiguation)
Pink Line (disambiguation)
Purple Line (disambiguation)
Red Line (disambiguation)
Silver Line (disambiguation)
Teal Line (disambiguation)
Turquoise Line (disambiguation)
Violet Line (disambiguation)
White Line (disambiguation)
Yellow Line (disambiguation)
