= Silver Line =

Silver Line may refer to:

== Public transit ==
=== Asia ===
- Silver Line (K-Rail), Kerala, India
- Silver Line (Manila), Manila, Philippines
- Silver Line (Wuhan), Wuhan, China
- Tokyo Metro Hibiya Line, color-coded as silver, Tokyo, Japan
- Bang Na–Suvarnabhumi light rail, color-coded as silver, Bangkok, Thailand

=== Europe ===
- Silver Line (Madrid Metro), Madrid, Spain
- Silver Line (Moscow), Moscow, Russia

=== North America ===
- Silver Line (DART), a hybrid rail line in Texas
- Silver Line (Grand Rapids), Grand Rapids, Michigan
- Lynx Silver Line, a proposed transit extension in Charlotte, North Carolina
- Silver Line (MBTA), a system of bus lines in Boston, Massachusetts
- METRORapid Silver Line, Houston, Texas
- Silver Line (Mexico City), Mexico City
- Silver Line (San Diego Trolley), a heritage streetcar line operated by the San Diego Trolley
- Silver Line (Washington Metro), a rapid transit line of the Washington Metro system
- L (New York City Subway service)
- S (New York City Subway service)
- HealthLine, Cleveland, Ohio
- J Line (Los Angeles Metro), formerly the Silver Line, Los Angeles, California
- Metro (Minnesota), lettered lines are color-coded "METRO Gray", Minneapolis—Saint Paul, Minnesota
- E Embarcadero, a light rail line of the Muni Metro system
- Silver Line (Pittsburgh), a light rail line of the Pittsburgh Light Rail system

=== South America ===
- Silver Line (Santiago Metro), Santiago, Chile
- Silver Line (São Paulo Metro), São Paulo, Brazil

== Other uses ==
- Silver Line (shipping company), a British company
- Silver Line Boats, an American boat manufacturer
- The Silver Line, a helpline for older people in the UK
- Silverline, a Christian music band
- Silverline Helicopters, a Canadian operator

== See also ==
- Silver Lining (disambiguation)

Aqua Line (disambiguation)
Black line (disambiguation)
Blue Line (disambiguation)
Light Blue Line (disambiguation)
Brown Line (disambiguation)
Gold Line (disambiguation)
Gray Line (disambiguation)
Green Line (disambiguation)
Light Green Line (disambiguation)
Magenta Line (disambiguation)
Orange Line (disambiguation)
Pink Line (disambiguation)
Purple Line (disambiguation)
Red Line (disambiguation)
Silver Line (disambiguation)
Teal Line (disambiguation)
Turquoise Line (disambiguation)
Violet Line (disambiguation)
White Line (disambiguation)
Yellow Line (disambiguation)
