= Light Green Line =

Light Green Line may refer to:

== Transportation ==
- Line 2 (Shanghai Metro), China
- Line 7 (Guangzhou Metro), China
- South Island line, Hong Kong, China
- Line 4 (Wuhan Metro), Wuhan, China
- Taipa Line, China
- Paris Metro Line 6, France
- Rangkasbitung Line of KRL Commuterline, Jakarta, Indonesia
- Lyublinsko-Dmitrovskaya line, Moscow, Russia
- Barcelona Metro line 11, Barcelona, Spain
- Line 5 (Madrid Metro), Madrid, Spain
- Wilmington/Newark Line, SEPTA, Pennsylvania-Delaware, United States
- R Line (RTD), Denver, Colorado, United States
- Line 2, Ottawa, Ontario, Canada

== See also ==
Aqua Line (disambiguation)
Black line (disambiguation)
Blue Line (disambiguation)
Light Blue Line (disambiguation)
Brown Line (disambiguation)
Gold Line (disambiguation)
Gray Line (disambiguation)
Green Line (disambiguation)
Light Green Line (disambiguation)
Magenta Line (disambiguation)
Orange Line (disambiguation)
Pink Line (disambiguation)
Purple Line (disambiguation)
Red Line (disambiguation)
Silver Line (disambiguation)
Teal Line (disambiguation)
Turquoise Line (disambiguation)
Violet Line (disambiguation)
White Line (disambiguation)
Yellow Line (disambiguation)
