= Aqua Line =

The Aqua Line is a name common to a number of rail systems around the world. It can refer to:

- Aqua Line (Mumbai Metro) Mumbai, Maharashtra, India
- Aqua Line (Noida Metro) Noida, Uttar Pradesh, India
- Aqua Line (Nagpur Metro) Nagpur, Maharashtra, India
- Aqua Line (Pune Metro) Pune, Maharashtra, India
- Aqua Line (Namma Metro) Bengaluru, Karnataka, India
- Canada Line Vancouver, British Columbia, Canada
- E Line (Los Angeles Metro) Los Angeles, California, United States of America
- Tokyo Bay Aqua-Line Tokyo Bay, Japan
- Mexico City Metro Line 4, Mexico

== See also ==
Aqua Line
Blue Line
Light Blue Line
Brown Line
Gold Line
Gray Line
Green Line
Light Green Line
Magenta Line
Orange Line
Pink Line
Purple Line
Red Line
Silver Line
Teal Line
Turquoise Line
Violet Line
White Line
Yellow Line
