= Charlotte Gateway Station =

Planned transit station in North Carolina, US

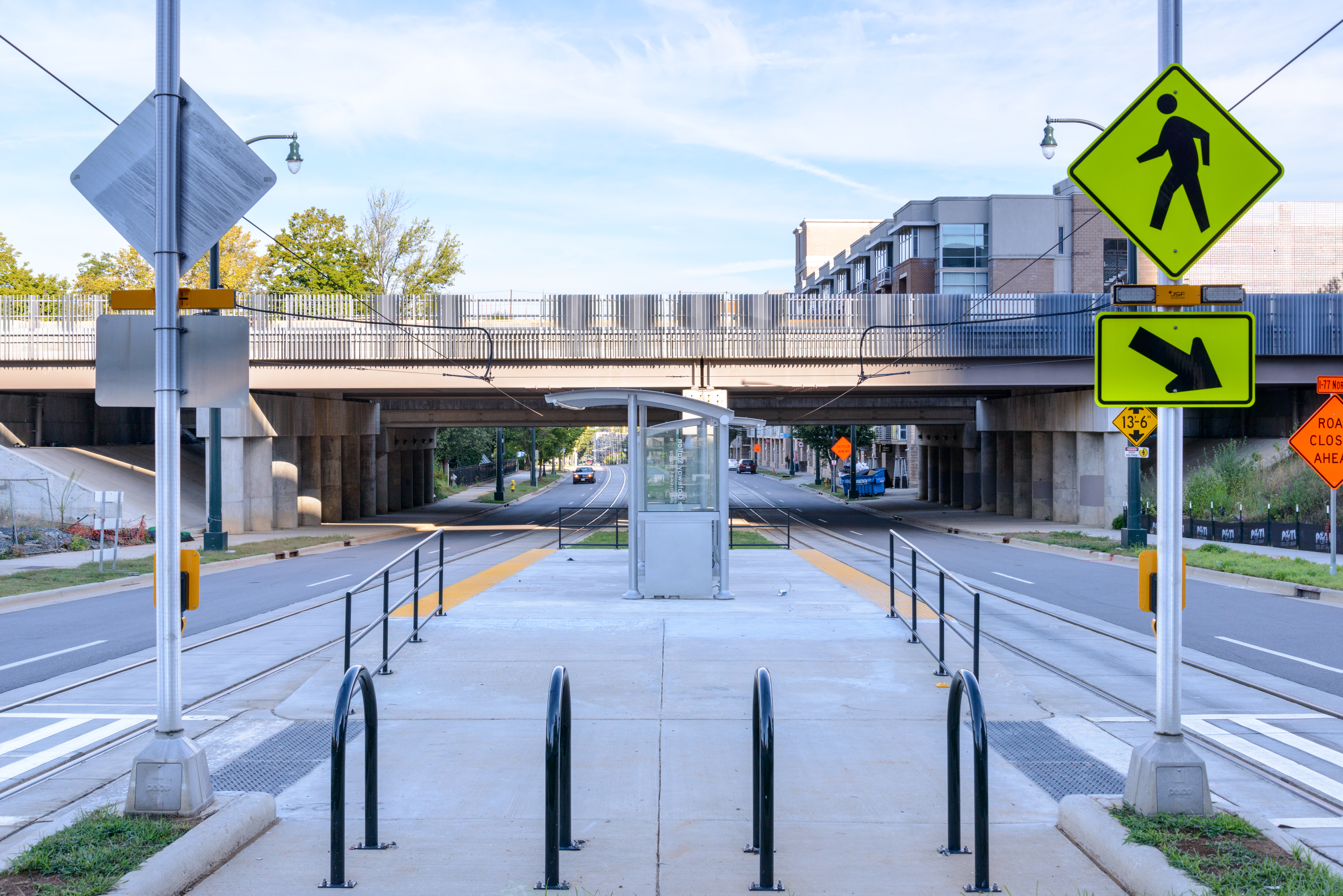

General information
- Location: 690 West Trade Street; Charlotte, North Carolina; United States
- Coordinates: 35°13′53″N 80°50′53″W
- Owner: Charlotte Area Transit System
- Platforms: 1 low-level island platform
- Tracks: 2
- Bus operators: Greyhound Lines

History
- Opened: August 30, 2021 (streetcar)
- Opening: 2027–2028 (intermodal station)

Services
Preceding station	CATS	Following station
Johnson & Wales University toward French Street	CityLynx Gold Line	Mint Street toward Sunnyside Avenue
Future services
Preceding station	Amtrak	Following station
Gastonia toward New Orleans	Crescent	Salisbury toward New York
Terminus	Carolinian	Kannapolis toward New York
Terminus	Piedmont	Kannapolis toward Raleigh
Preceding station	CATS	Following station
Terminus	Lynx Red Line	Derita toward Mount Mourne
Graham toward Belmont	Lynx Silver Line	Morehead toward Indian Trail
Location

Charlotte Gateway Station is a future intermodal transit station in Charlotte, North Carolina, United States. Currently operating as a streetcar stop for the CityLynx Gold Line, with an adjoining bus station for Greyhound Lines intercity buses, it is the centerpiece of the overall 19-acre (7.7 ha) Station District, and it will serve Charlotte Area Transit System (CATS) bus lines, the Lynx Silver Line light rail, and Amtrak intercity trains. The district will also include parking facilities, mixed-use development and an elevated greenway. Estimated at a cost of $800.1 million (2017 US dollars) for full implementation of all public and private components, the project will be built in three phases, with Amtrak service tentatively scheduled to start in 2027–2028.

== History ==
In 1991, the City of Charlotte and the North Carolina Department of Transportation (NCDOT) completed a preliminary feasibility study for a new Uptown rail station to replace the existing Amtrak station, built in 1962 by the Southern Railway and located on North Tryon Street near the rail yard for SOU's successor, Norfolk Southern. The site chosen along West Trade Street, currently a Greyhound station since 1973, was once the location of three previous stations: the Atlanta & Charlotte Depot (prior to 1886), the Richmond and Danville Depot (1886-1905) and the Southern Depot (1905-1962).

In 1998, NCDOT began the acquisition of property for the station and supportive land uses (i.e. retail and offices). In 2002, NCDOT completed its feasibility study for the Charlotte Multi-Modal Station and Area Track Improvements. The study identified two possible options: The Preferred Alternative, which included the station, various track work and a greenway at $206.8 million (2002 dollars), and the Station Build Only Alternative at $109.6 million (2002 dollars). By 2004, NCDOT had completed property acquisition of 27-acre (110,000 m^{2}).

Announced publicly in August 2005, the proposed Gateway Station is envisioned to serve as both a multimodal transit center in addition to both office and retail space. As originally presented, the station would feature an underground station for CATS buses, a 100,000-square-foot (9,300 m^{2}) office building, and soaring lobby for other rail and bus services in the building's atrium.

In 2009, the American Recovery and Reinvestment Act of 2009 awarded $520 million grant for the Piedmont Improvement Project in North Carolina; which was used to make rail improvements identified in the 2002 feasibility study. In that same year, an Environmental impact assessment was completed that resulted in a Finding of No Significant Impact (FONSI) and the City of Charlotte and NCDOT signed a municipal agreement.

In 2012, NCDOT completed property acquisition again of approximately 18-acre (73,000 m^{2}) for the Charlotte Gateway Station project. On November 1, 2012, NCDOT selected Houston-based developer, the Hines Group, for the project. In 2015, NCDOT won a $25 Million TIGER Grant, to help start construction of Gateway Station.

On August 30, 2021, the streetcar station was opened as part of the second phase of the CityLynx Gold Line.

The station's inter-city tracks and platform were completed in November 2022. The first test run of a Piedmont train using the station occurred on November 29, 2022.

In March 2025, because phase two of construction has stalled for several years, NCDOT confirmed it is in discussions with its partners, including the City of Charlotte, about establishing an early station, located on land owned by the state across Trade Street along Wilkes Place. The proposed temporary station would be 4,828 square feet (448.5 m^{2}) and cost nearly $13 million; most of funding being requested through the Federal Railroad Administration.

== Station plans ==
The station was built with a streetcar platform, which provides connection to the CityLynx Gold Line, and a 1,100 ft (340 m) long, fully ADA compliant high-level platform, the second in the state behind Raleigh Union Station, for Amtrak service. It will be the southern terminus of Amtrak's Carolinian and Piedmont lines, as well as a service stop on Amtrak's Crescent and a major stop on the planned Southeast High Speed Rail Corridor. It will significantly improve connections between Amtrak and local transit. CATS plans for the station to be a stop on the Lynx Silver Line. An adjacent, interim bus station was built for Greyhound, which provides connections to routes running to Atlanta, Detroit, Jacksonville, New York City and Philadelphia.

== Construction ==
Both the Charlotte Area Transit System (CATS) and NCDOT have started/completed various projects that impact the future station, including the CityLynx Gold Line and a new Locomotive and Railcar Maintenance Facility located on West Summit Avenue. However, groundbreaking for the Charlotte Gateway Station did not begin until July 2018. The project is using a phased implementation approach to facilitate the near-term development of the rail station while also setting the stage for private development to occur. There are three general phases with additional sub-phases.

=== Phase 1 ===
The temporary Charlotte Greyhound Station in May 2021

At an estimate cost of $91.3 million (2017 dollars), the first phase has two parts:

- 1A) Construct 2,000 feet (610 m) of track, structures, and signals to support two new station tracks; construct retaining wall/earthwork; construct temporary intercity bus facility (completed August, 2019).
- 1B) Construct rail platform and canopy for passenger loading/unloading.

Construction of Phase 1 was completed in November 2022.

=== Phase 2 ===
At an estimate cost of $49.9 million (2017 dollars), the second phase has two parts:

- 2A) Construct platform canopy; construct station building (interim condition) with full construction of concourse level and core and shell only for plaza and mezzanine levels; construct temporary surface parking and passenger drop-off area.
- 2B) Decommission existing Amtrak station on North Tryon Street.

This phase is partially funded with capital carryover from phase 1. As of late 2024, no physical progress has been made on the site, with city officials confirming that the planning and funding efforts are still ongoing, with no definitive timeline in place.

=== Phase 3 ===
At an estimate cost of $658.9 million (2017 dollars), the third phase has three parts:

- 3A) Construct greenway connection with bridge over Fourth Street, vertical circulation and retaining walls; construct bus facility, which includes structured parking and residential over retail wrapping garage (facility will serve as temporary parking for rail passengers till phase 3B is completed).
- 3B) Complete upper section of station building; extend greenway with bridge over Trade Street, vertical circulation and retaining walls; extend greenway to Bank of America Stadium; construct private development around station.
- 3C) Construct remote properties between Fifth and Seventh Streets; extend greenway to Ninth Street.

This phase is currently not funded, but is expected to be developed mostly by private developers.

== Station layout ==
As of December 2, 2022, the station consists of one island platform in the center of Trade Street, for Gold Line service, and it is located on what will become the front entrance of the intermodal station. A second, high-level island platform is located alongside Norfolk Southern's tracks for Amtrak service, but not in service.
