= Blue Train =

Blue Train may refer to:

== Rail ==
- Blue Train (South Africa), a South African luxury train
- Blue Train (Japan), the generic name for sleeping car trains in Japan
- The Blue Train (fr. Le Train Bleu), a train that ran between Calais and the French Riviera
  - Le Train Bleu (ballet), a ballet by Bronislava Nijinska, music by Darius Milhaud, scenario by Jean Cocteau, set by Henri Laurens, Chanel and Picasso (Ballets Russes, 1924)
- British Rail Class 303 or Blue Train, electric suburban trains introduced on the North Clyde Line and elsewhere in the Glasgow area
- Blue Train (Yugoslavia), referred to as Tito's Blue Train, a luxury train used by former Yugoslav President Josip Broz Tito
- Blue Train (Turkey), passenger train service in Turkey

== Other uses ==
- Le Train Bleu (restaurant) or The Blue Train, a restaurant
- Blue Train, a nickname for the U.S. Postal Service cycling team
- The Mystery of the Blue Train, a work of detective fiction by Agatha Christie set on Le Train Bleu
- Blue Train, a 2010 Serbian film on life after the death of Tito

== Music ==
=== Albums ===
- Blue Train (album), a 1958 jazz album by John Coltrane

=== Songs ===
- "Blue Train" (composition), 1958 jazz standard by John Coltrane
- "Blue Train" (Asian Kung-Fu Generation song), a 2005 song by Asian Kung-Fu Generation
- "Blue Train" (Billie Holiday song), a song by Billie Holiday
- "Blue Train" (Johnny Cash song), a song by Johnny Cash
- "Blue Train" (Linda Ronstadt song), a song by Linda Ronstadt
- "Blue Train", a song by Cibo Matto from Stereo * Type A
- "Blue Train", a song by Lord Rockingham's XI
- "Blue Train", a song by Page and Plant composed by Jimmy Page, Robert Plant, Charlie Jones and Michael Lee

== See also ==
- Blue Line (disambiguation)
- Blue Pullman (disambiguation), trainsets operated by British Railways
- Blue Train Races, a series of record-breaking attempts between automobiles and trains
- Blue Train Bentley, two automobiles involved in the Blue Train Races
- All Aboard the Blue Train, a 1962 album by Johnny Cash
- Blues Train, moving musical entertainment, Victoria, Australia
