= Teal Line =

Teal Line may refer to:

== China ==
- Daxing line, a rapid transit line in Beijing
- Line 4 (Beijing Subway), a rapid transit line
- Line 18 (Chengdu Metro), a rapid transit line
- Line 8 (Guangzhou Metro), a rapid transit line
- Airport Express (MTR), a rapid transit line in Hong Kong
- Line 6 (Kunming Metro), a rapid transit line
- Shanghai maglev train, a magnetic levitation rail line
- Line 6 (Shenyang Metro), a rapid transit line

== Elsewhere ==
- Mexico City Metro Line 4, a rapid transit line in Mexico
- Jurong Region MRT Line, a rapid transit line in Singapore
- W Line (RTD), a light rail line in the United States

== See also ==
Aqua Line (disambiguation)
Black line (disambiguation)
Blue Line (disambiguation)
Light Blue Line (disambiguation)
Brown Line (disambiguation)
Gold Line (disambiguation)
Gray Line (disambiguation)
Green Line (disambiguation)
Light Green Line (disambiguation)
Magenta Line (disambiguation)
Orange Line (disambiguation)
Pink Line (disambiguation)
Purple Line (disambiguation)
Red Line (disambiguation)
Silver Line (disambiguation)
Teal Line (disambiguation)
Turquoise Line (disambiguation)
Violet Line (disambiguation)
White Line (disambiguation)
Yellow Line (disambiguation)
