= Gray Line =

Gray Line or Grey Line may refer to:

== Transportation ==
- Gray Line Worldwide, an international sightseeing bus operator
- Grey Line (Bangkok), a planned monorail line in Bangkok, Thailand
- Grey Line (Delhi Metro), Delhi, India
- Gray Coach, a former Canadian inter-city bus line based in Toronto
- E Embarcadero, San Francisco, California
- Jubilee line, London, England
- Line 6 Finch West, Toronto, Canada
- Line 9 (Shenzhen Metro), Shenzhen, China
- Metro (Minnesota), lettered lines are color-coded "METRO Gray", Minneapolis—Saint Paul, Minnesota
- Olympic Park railway line, Sydney, Australia
- Pujiang line, Shanghai, China
- Serpukhovsko-Timiryazevskaya line, known as the Grey Line, Moscow, Russia

=== New York City Subway ===
- BMT Canarsie Line
- L (New York City Subway service)
- S (New York City Subway service), three separate rapid transit subway shuttles

== Other uses ==
- Grayline lascar
- Terminator (solar) or grey line, delimiting the illuminated and dark sides of a planetary body
- The Long Gray Line

== See also ==
Aqua Line (disambiguation)
Black line (disambiguation)
Blue Line (disambiguation)
Light Blue Line (disambiguation)
Brown Line (disambiguation)
Gold Line (disambiguation)
Gray Line (disambiguation)
Green Line (disambiguation)
Light Green Line (disambiguation)
Magenta Line (disambiguation)
Orange Line (disambiguation)
Pink Line (disambiguation)
Purple Line (disambiguation)
Red Line (disambiguation)
Silver Line (disambiguation)
Teal Line (disambiguation)
Turquoise Line (disambiguation)
Violet Line (disambiguation)
White Line (disambiguation)
Yellow Line (disambiguation)
