= Pink Line =

Pink Line may refer to:

== Asia ==
=== China ===
- Disneyland Resort line, a rapid transit line in Hong Kong
- Line 13 (Shanghai Metro), a rapid transit rail line in China

=== India ===
- Pink Line (Ahmedabad Metro), a proposed rapid transit line
- Pink Line (Delhi Metro), a rapid transit line
- Pink Line (Jaipur Metro), a rapid transit line
- Pink Line (Kolkata Metro), a proposed rapid transit line
- Pink Line (Mumbai Metro), a rapid transit line
- Pink Line (Namma Metro), an under construction rapid transit line
- Pink Line (Pune Metro), an under construction rapid transit line

=== Japan ===
- Sennichimae Line, a rapid transit line in Osaka

=== Other ===
- Pink Line (Bangkok), a monorail line in Thailand
- KAI Commuter Tanjung Priok Line, a commuter rail line in Jakarta, Indonesia
- Seoul Subway Line 8, a rapid transit rail line in Korea

== Europe ==
=== Spain ===
- Barcelona Metro line 8, a rapid transit line
- Line 8 (Madrid Metro), a rapid transit line

=== United Kingdom ===
- Hammersmith & City line, a rapid transit line in London, England
- Network Norwich Pink Line, a bus route in Norwich, England

=== Other ===
- RER E, a regional rail line in Paris, France

== North America ==
=== Canada ===
- Pink Line (Montreal Metro), a proposed rapid transit line
- Viva Pink, a bus rapid transit line in York Region, Ontario

=== Mexico ===
- Mexico City Metro Line 1, a heavy rail rapid transit line
- Mexico City Metrobús Line 6, a bus rapid transit line
- Line 3 (Sistema de Tren Eléctrico Urbano), a rapid transit line in Guadalajara

=== United States ===
- Pink Line (CTA), rapid transit line in Chicago, Illinois
- K Line (Los Angeles Metro), a light rail line in Los Angeles, California

== South America ==
=== Brazil ===
- Line 20 (São Paulo Metro), a proposed rapid transit line

== See also ==
Aqua Line (disambiguation)
Black line (disambiguation)
Blue Line (disambiguation)
Light Blue Line (disambiguation)
Brown Line (disambiguation)
Gold Line (disambiguation)
Gray Line (disambiguation)
Green Line (disambiguation)
Light Green Line (disambiguation)
Magenta Line (disambiguation)
Orange Line (disambiguation)
Pink Line (disambiguation)
Purple Line (disambiguation)
Red Line (disambiguation)
Silver Line (disambiguation)
Teal Line (disambiguation)
Turquoise Line (disambiguation)
Violet Line (disambiguation)
White Line (disambiguation)
Yellow Line (disambiguation)
