= Yellow Line =

Yellow line or Yellow Line may refer to:

- Yellow line (road marking), road marking
- Yellow Line (Gaza) a ceasefire line in the Gaza strip as part of the Gaza peace plan
- In the 1st & Ten (graphics system) graphics system, a depiction of the first down line on television broadcasts of football games

== Transportation ==
=== The Americas ===
- Yellow Line (Montreal Metro), Quebec, Canada
- Yellow Line (Rio de Janeiro), highway known in Portuguese as Linha Amarela
- Line 4 (São Paulo Metro), São Paulo, Brazil
- Line 4 (Rio de Janeiro), Rio de Janeiro Brazil
- Line 1 Yonge–University, Toronto Subway, Canada
- Millennium Line, Vancouver SkyTrain, Canada
- Yellow Line (CTA), Chicago, Illinois, US
- BMT Broadway Line in New York City, colored yellow, serving N, Q, R and W trains
  - Yellow N Line
  - Yellow Q Line
  - Yellow R Line
  - Yellow W Line
- MAX Yellow Line (TriMet), Portland, Oregon, US
- Yellow Line (Washington Metro), Washington, DC, US
- Yellow Line (Baltimore), Baltimore, Maryland, US
- Yellow Line (BART), Bay Area Rapid Transit, San Francisco, California, US
- Gold Line (MARTA) in Atlanta, Georgia, originally called "Yellow Line"
- MBTA bus, colored yellow and sometimes referred to as the Yellow Line
- Mexico City Metro Line 5
- Mexico City Metrobús Line 4
- Line 4 of the Guadalajara urban rail system
- E Line (Los Angeles Metro), Los Angeles, California, US
- L Line (Los Angeles Metro), Los Angeles, California, US
- Metro Gold Line (Minnesota), Minneapolis–Saint Paul, Minnesota, US
- L Line (RTD), Denver, Colorado, US

=== Asia ===
==== India ====
- Yellow Line (Ahmedabad Metro), Ahmedabad, India
- Yellow Line (Namma Metro), Bengaluru, India
- Yellow Line (Delhi Metro), Delhi, India
- Yellow Line (Kolkata Metro), Kolkata, India
- Yellow Line (Mumbai Metro), Mumbai, India

==== South Korea ====
- Line 3 (Daegu Metro), South Korea
- Incheon Airport Maglev, Incheon, South Korea
- Suin-Bundang Line, Seoul, South Korea

==== Taiwan ====
- Yellow line (Kaohsiung MRT), Kaohsiung, Taiwan
- Circular line (Taipei metropolitan area), New Taipei City, Taiwan

==== Others ====
- Yellow Line (Bangkok), Bangkok, Thailand
- Yellow Flag Line, an ferry service operating on the Chao Phraya River north from Bangkok, Thailand
- Loop Line, KRL Commuterline, Jakarta, Indonesia
- LRT Line 1 (Metro Manila), known as Yellow Line before 2012, Manila, Philippines
- MRT Line 3 (Metro Manila), known as Yellow Line since 2012, Manila, Philippines
- Line 13, Beijing Subway, Beijing, China
- Line 3, Shanghai Metro, Shanghai, China
- Line 1, Guangzhou Metro, Guangzhou, China
- Line 4 (Riyadh Metro), Riyadh, Saudi Arabia
- Circle Line (Singapore), Singapore
- Putrajaya Line, Klang Valley, Malaysia
- Tokyo Metro Yūrakuchō Line, Tokyo, Japan
- Yellow Bus Line, a large bus company in Mindanao, Philippines

=== Europe ===
- Barcelona Metro line 4, Spain
- Bucharest Metro Line M1, Bucharest, Romania
- M2 (Copenhagen), Denmark
- U4 (Berlin U-Bahn), Germany
- Line M3 - Milan Subway (Metropolitana di Milano), Italy
- Circle line (London Underground), United Kingdom
- Line 3 (Madrid Metro), Spain
- Tyne and Wear Metro of Newcastle upon Tyne, UK
- RER C, Paris, France
- Line B (Prague Metro), Czech Republic
- Sheffield Supertram Yellow Line, UK
- Kalininsko-Solntsevskaya line, Moscow, Russia
- Yellow Line (Lisbon Metro), one of the four lines of Lisbon Metro

=== Africa ===
- Yellow Line (Abuja Light Rail), Lagos, Nigeria

=== Oceania ===
- Blue Mountains Line, New South Wales, Australia
- T1 North Shore & Western Line, Sydney, New South Wales, Australia

== See also ==
- The Thin Yellow Line

Aqua Line (disambiguation)
Black line (disambiguation)
Blue Line (disambiguation)
Light Blue Line (disambiguation)
Brown Line (disambiguation)
Gold Line (disambiguation)
Gray Line (disambiguation)
Green Line (disambiguation)
Light Green Line (disambiguation)
Magenta Line (disambiguation)
Orange Line (disambiguation)
Pink Line (disambiguation)
Purple Line (disambiguation)
Red Line (disambiguation)
Silver Line (disambiguation)
Teal Line (disambiguation)
Turquoise Line (disambiguation)
Violet Line (disambiguation)
White Line (disambiguation)
Yellow Line (disambiguation)
