= Violet Line =

Violet Line may refer to:

- Violet Line (1914), a boundary between the Ottoman Empire and the British Empire in Arabia
- Violet line piranha, a species of fish
- Violet Line (Delhi Metro), a line of the rapid transit system in Delhi, India
- Violet Line (Ahmedabad Metro), a line of the rapid transit system in Ahmedabad, India
- Line 6 (Riyadh Metro), a line of the rapid transit system in Riyadh, Saudi Arabia. (Also sometimes referred as Purple Line)
- Line 16 (São Paulo Metro), a proposed rapid transit line in São Paulo, Brazil

== See also ==
Aqua Line (disambiguation)
Black line (disambiguation)
Blue Line (disambiguation)
Light Blue Line (disambiguation)
Brown Line (disambiguation)
Gold Line (disambiguation)
Gray Line (disambiguation)
Green Line (disambiguation)
Light Green Line (disambiguation)
Magenta Line (disambiguation)
Orange Line (disambiguation)
Pink Line (disambiguation)
Purple Line (disambiguation)
Red Line (disambiguation)
Silver Line (disambiguation)
Teal Line (disambiguation)
Turquoise Line (disambiguation)
Violet Line (disambiguation)
White Line (disambiguation)
Yellow Line (disambiguation)
