= Brown Line =

Brown Line may refer to:

- Brown line, a process defined as siderotype, a monochrome printing process
- Brown Line (Bangkok), Thailand
- Brown Line (CTA), Chicago
- Brown Line (Delhi Metro), Delhi, India
- Brown Line (Mexico City Metro), Mexico
- Brown Line (Pittsburgh), Pittsburgh, Pennsylvania
- Bakerloo line, London, United Kingdom
- BMT Nassau Street Line, a rapid transit line in New York City
  - J/Z (New York City Subway service)
- Tangerang Line of KRL Commuterline, Jakarta, Indonesia
- Line 18 (São Paulo Metro), São Paulo, Brazil
- Paris Metro Line 11, Paris, France
- Thomson–East Coast Line, Singapore
- Ma On Shan line, Hong Kong, China
- Tuen Ma line, Hong Kong, China
- U5 (Berlin U-Bahn), Berlin, Germany
- Wenhu line, Taipei, Taiwan
- Copper Line (San Diego Trolley), San Diego, California
- Metro Bronze Line (Minnesota), Minneapolis–Saint Paul, Minnesota

== See also ==
Aqua Line (disambiguation)
Black line (disambiguation)
Blue Line (disambiguation)
Light Blue Line (disambiguation)
Brown Line (disambiguation)
Gold Line (disambiguation)
Gray Line (disambiguation)
Green Line (disambiguation)
Light Green Line (disambiguation)
Magenta Line (disambiguation)
Orange Line (disambiguation)
Pink Line (disambiguation)
Purple Line (disambiguation)
Red Line (disambiguation)
Silver Line (disambiguation)
Teal Line (disambiguation)
Turquoise Line (disambiguation)
Violet Line (disambiguation)
White Line (disambiguation)
Yellow Line (disambiguation)
