= Caterpillar G3600 =

Caterpillar G3606

Overview
- Manufacturer: Caterpillar Incorporated
- Production: 1991 - present

Layout
- Configuration: I6, I8, V12, V16
- Displacement: 21.2 litres (1,294 in^{3}) per cylinder
- Cylinder bore: 300 millimetres (11.81 in)
- Piston stroke: 300 millimetres (11.81 in)
- Compression ratio: 9.1:1 (A4 Gen 1) 7.6:1 (A4 Gen 2)

RPM range
- Idle speed: 550
- Max. engine speed: 1000

Combustion
- Turbocharger: Double or Quad
- Management: Electronic
- Fuel type: Natural gas, propane, biogas

Output
- Power output: up to 2,065 brake horsepower (1,540 kW) @ 1000 rpm

Dimensions
- Length: 167.33 inches (4,250.2 mm)
- Width: 86.17 inches (2,188.7 mm)
- Height: 116.16 inches (2,950.5 mm)
- Dry weight: 36,883.0 pounds (16,730 kg)

Emissions
- Emissions target standard: EPA & IMO Tier 2

The Caterpillar G3600 is a family of gas internal combustion engines made by Caterpillar. The G3600 series was first introduced in 1991. The engines range from six to sixteen cylinders. Each cylinder offers 21.2 liters in displacement (1294 cubic inches) has a size of 11.8 × 11.8 bore/stroke. Engine ratings are available from 1875 - 5500 horsepower at 1000 RPM, depending on the model. The different models weigh between roughly seventeen and thirty-three tons (34,560 - 65,900 pounds). The G3600 engines are often used in gas compression applications.

== History ==
The G3600 series originally launched in 1991 with only the G3606 model. The G3608, G3612, and G3616 models would follow through 1994. The G3600 A3 generation was introduced in 2002, followed by the A4 (Gen 1) in 2015. The A4 Gen 2 followed in 2023. The A4 Gen 2 model has been produced with Caterpillar's Closed Crankcase Ventilation (CCV) System as a standard since January 2025.

As of September 2023, over 8,500 G3600 engines were in operation globally.
