= Light Blue Line =

Light Blue Line may refer to:

== Transportation ==
- Inner West & Leppington Line, Australia
- Paris Metro Line 13, Paris, France
- East Rail line, Hong Kong
- Cikarang Loop Line of KRL Commuterline, Jakarta, Indonesia
- Nankō Port Town Line, Osaka, Japan
- Filyovskaya line, Moscow, Russia
- Seoul Subway Line 4, South Korea
- Line 1 (Madrid Metro), Spain
- Light Blue Line (Bangkok), Thailand
- Victoria line, London, United Kingdom
- E Line (Los Angeles Metro), California, United States
- K Ingleside in San Francisco, California, United States
- A Line (RTD), Colorado, United States

== See also ==
Aqua Line (disambiguation)
Black line (disambiguation)
Blue Line (disambiguation)
Light Blue Line (disambiguation)
Brown Line (disambiguation)
Gold Line (disambiguation)
Gray Line (disambiguation)
Green Line (disambiguation)
Light Green Line (disambiguation)
Magenta Line (disambiguation)
Orange Line (disambiguation)
Pink Line (disambiguation)
Purple Line (disambiguation)
Red Line (disambiguation)
Silver Line (disambiguation)
Teal Line (disambiguation)
Turquoise Line (disambiguation)
Violet Line (disambiguation)
White Line (disambiguation)
Yellow Line (disambiguation)
