= Green Line =

Green Line may refer to:

== Places ==
=== Military and political ===
- Green Line (France), the German occupation line in France during World War II
- Green Line (Israel), the 1949 armistice line established between Israel and its neighbours
  - City Line (Jerusalem), part of the Green Line between Israel and Jordan which divided Jerusalem from 1948 and 1967
- Green Line (Lebanon), demarcation line between Christian and Muslim militias in Beirut during the Lebanese Civil War
- Green Line, part of the United Nations Buffer Zone in Cyprus that runs through Nicosia and a colloquial name for the buffer zone as a whole
- Green Line, part of the GHQ Line defence works built in the UK during World War II
- Gothic Line, a German defensive line in Italy built during World War II, renamed the "Green Line" in June 1944

=== Other uses in places ===
- Green Line (Atlanta development corridor), a development corridor in Downtown Atlanta
- The cities of Virginia Beach, Virginia, and Chico, California each have an urban growth boundary called the "Green Line"

== Companies and brands ==
- Green Bus Lines, a former transit company in New York City
- "Green Lines", name for former branch of the New York Railways Corporation
- Green Star Line, a former steamship company
- Saturn Aura Green Line, a mild hybrid automobile made by Saturn
- Saturn Vue Green Line, a compact SUV made by Saturn

== Transit lines ==
Many bus, rail, subway, and tram lines around the world are either officially or colloquially named the "Green Line". These include:

=== Africa ===
==== Egypt ====
- Line 3, part of the greater Cairo metro network, Cairo

==== Ethiopia ====
- Green Line, part of the Addis Ababa Light Rail system, Addis Ababa

==== Nigeria ====
- Green Line (Lagos Transit), part of the Lagos Rail Mass Transit System, Lagos

=== Asia ===
==== Australia ====
- T8 Airport & South Line, Sydney
- Caboolture Line, Brisbane
- Southern Highlands Line, New South Wales

==== China ====
- Line 8 (Beijing Subway), Beijing
- Line 4 (Guangzhou Metro), Guangzhou
- Kwun Tong line, a rapid transit line in Hong Kong
- South Island line, a rapid transit line in Hong Kong
- Line 12 (Shanghai Metro), Shanghai

==== India ====
- Green Line (Namma Metro), Bengaluru
- Green Line (Chennai Metro)
- Green Line (Delhi Metro)
- Green Line (Hyderabad Metro)
- Green Line (Kolkata Metro)
- Green Line (Mumbai Metro)

==== Indonesia ====
- Bekasi Line of Jabodebek LRT, Jakarta
- Rangkasbitung Line of KRL Commuterline, Jakarta, popularly referred as "Green Line" despite its light green color

==== Israel ====
- Green Line (Jerusalem Light Rail), the second line of the Jerusalem Light Rail
- Green Line (Tel Aviv Light Rail), Tel Aviv

==== Japan ====
- Green Line, the commuter service of the Tōkyū Tōyoko Line, Yokohama
- Chūō Line (Osaka), a subway line in Osaka
- Chiyoda Line, a subway line in Tokyo
- Green Line (Yokohama), a subway line in Yokohama

==== Pakistan ====
- Green Line Express, a passenger train operated by Pakistan Railways between Karachi and Islamabad
- Green Line - Karachi Metrobus, a bus rapid transit line under construction in Karachi

==== Philippines ====
- Greenline Express, a city bus company in the Philippines
- Manila Light Rail Transit System Line 1, Manila

==== South Korea ====
- Line 2 (Seoul Metro)
- Line 7 (Seoul Metro), the line uses an "olive" color
- Line 2 (Busan Metro)
- Line 2 (Daegu Metro)
- Line 1 (Gwangju Metro)
- Line 1 (Daejeon Metro)
- Gyeongui-Jungang Line, a commuter rail line in Seoul
- Gyeongchun Line, a regional rail line in Seoul
- Yongin Everline, a people mover line in Yongin
- Seohae Line, Gyeonggi-do

==== Taiwan ====
- Green line (Taoyuan Metro), a rapid transit line of the Taoyuan Metro
- Green line (Taichung MRT), a rapid transit line in Taichung
- Green Line (Taipei Metro), Taipei

==== Thailand ====
- Silom line, Dark Green line, a rapid transit line in Bangkok
- Sukhumvit line, Light Green line, a rapid transit line in Bangkok

==== Other uses in Asia ====
- Green Line (Doha Metro), Qatar
- Green Line (Dubai Metro), United Arab Emirates
- Dzerzhinskaya Line, a rapid transit line in Novosibirsk, Russia
- Kajang Line, Klang Valley, Malaysia
- Line 5 (Riyadh Metro), Riyadh, Saudi Arabia
- East West MRT line, a rapid transit line in Singapore

=== Europe ===
- Green Line (Lisbon Metro), one of the four lines of Lisbon Metro
- Line A (Prague Metro), Prague, Czech Republic
- M1 (Copenhagen Metro), Copenhagen, Denmark
- Lyon Metro Line D, Lyon, France
- RER D, a regional rail line in Paris, France
- Line 4 (Budapest Metro), Budapest, Hungary
- Green Line (Luas), one of the two tram lines in Dublin, Ireland
- Line M2 - Milan Subway (Metropolitana di Milano), Milan, Italy
- Line C of the Porto Metro, Porto, Portugal
- Green Line, a route of the TOMA minibus, Caldas da Rainha, Portugal
- Bucharest Metro Line M4, Bucharest, Romania
- Zamoskvoretskaya line, a rapid transit line in Moscow, Russia
- Nevsko-Vasileostrovskaya Line, a rapid transit line in Saint Petersburg, Russia
- Barcelona Metro line 3, Barcelona, Spain
- Line 5 (Madrid Metro), Madrid, Spain
- Green Line (Stockholm Metro), Sweden
- Oleksiivska Line, a rapid transit line in Kharkiv, Ukraine
- Syretsko–Pecherska line, a rapid transit line in Kyiv, Ukraine
- Green Line Coaches, a commuter coach network in London, UK
  - Green Line route 724, a bus service in the outskirts of London
  - Green Line route 797, a former bus service between Hatfield and London
  - Green Line routes X1 and X10, a former bus route in Essex and London
- District line, a rapid transit line in London, UK, coloured green on maps
- Green Line, one of the two lines in the Tyne and Wear Metro, NE England, UK
- Green Line Coach Station, a bus station in London, UK

=== North America ===
==== Canada ====
- Green Line (Calgary), a light rail line currently under construction in Calgary, Alberta
- Green Line (Montreal Metro), a rapid transit line in Montreal
- Line 2 Bloor–Danforth, a rapid transit line in Toronto
- Viva Green, a rapid bus transit line in York Region, Ontario
- Green Line, a bus route of the WEGO Niagara Falls Visitor Transportation system, Niagara Falls, Ontario
- Line 2 (O-Train), a diesel light rail line in Ottawa

==== Mexico ====
- Green Line (Mexico City Metro)
- Green-and-Gray Line (Mexico City Metro)
- Green Line (Mexico City Metrobús)
- Olive Line (Mexico City Metro)
- Olive Line (Mexico City Metrobús)
- Line 2 of the Guadalajara urban rail system

==== United States ====
- Green Line (Baltimore), a proposed transit line in Baltimore, Maryland
- Green Line (CTA), Chicago, Illinois
- Green Line (MARTA) rapid transit line in Atlanta, Georgia, (formerly the Proctor Creek Line)
- Green Line (MBTA), a light rail system in Boston, Massachusetts
- Green Line (Miami Metrorail), rapid transit line in Miami, Florida
- Metro Green Line (Minnesota), a light rail line in Minneapolis-St. Paul, Minnesota
- Green Line (SacRT), a light rail line in Sacramento, California
- Green Line (San Diego Trolley), a light rail line in San Diego, California
- Green Line (Washington Metro), rapid transit line in Washington, D.C., and Prince George's County, Maryland
- Green Line (RTA Rapid Transit), a light rail line in Cleveland and Shaker Heights, Ohio
- Green Line (BART), rapid transit line in San Francisco Bay Area, California
- C Line (Los Angeles Metro), a light rail line in the Los Angeles Metro system, formerly the Green Line
- B Line (RTD), commuter rail line in Denver, Colorado
- D Line (RTD), light rail line in Denver, Colorado
- MAX Green Line, light rail line in Portland, Oregon
- Green Line (St. Louis MetroLink), a planned light rail expansion in St. Louis, Missouri
- Green Line, a bus route of the First Coast Flyer, Jacksonville, Florida
- Green Line, an sbX bus rapid transit line in San Bernardino
- Route 777 "Green Line", a route of Albuquerque Rapid Transit, Albuquerque, New Mexico
- IRT Lexington Avenue Line in New York City, colored green, serving 4, 5, 6, and <6> trains
- IND Crosstown Line, in New York City, colored lime green, serving G train
- Green Line, a route of the Emerald Express bus rapid transit line in Eugene, Oregon
- SEPTA subway–surface trolley lines, a light rail system in Philadelphia, Pennsylvania
- Greenline (Pennsylvania), a proposed transit line in southeastern Pennsylvania
- Green Line (CapMetro), a proposed expansion of Capital MetroRail, Austin, Texas
- Green Line (DART), a light rail line in Dallas, Texas
- Green Line, former name of the Trinity Railway Express, Dallas, Texas
- Green Line (TRAX), a light rail line in Salt Lake City, Utah
- Green Line (Sound Transit), a light rail line in Seattle, Washington
- Swift Green Line, a planned bus rapid transit line in Snohomish County, Washington
- Green Line (The Vine), a bus rapid transit line in Vancouver, Washington
- Green Line (Pittsburgh), a bus rapid transit line in Pittsburgh, Pennsylvania
- Green Line (VTA), a light rail service in Santa Clara County, California
- Shelby Farms Greenline, a rail trail Tennessee
- Waterbury and Milldale Tramway, a former streetcar line locally known as the "Green Line"
- METRORail Green Line, a light rail line in Houston, Texas

=== South America ===
- Green Line, portion of the Mi Teleférico cable car transit system in La Paz, Bolivia
- Line 2 (São Paulo Metro), São Paulo, Brazil
- Line 2 (Rio de Janeiro Metro), Rio de Janeiro, Brazil

== Road transportation ==
- Green Belt (Pittsburgh), Pennsylvania

== Other uses ==
- An underground sanitary sewer in the American Public Works Association utility location color code
- Art on a Green Line, the name of a 2015 art exhibition at Carleton University, Ottawa, Canada
- Green Line Rivalry, an athletic rivalry between Boston College and Boston University
- Green Stripe, a 1905 drawing by Henri Matisse
- Operation Greenline, Second World War
- The Green Line, a 1944 Terrytoons Mighty Mouse short
- Green Line (film), a 2019 Indian documentary film

== See also ==
- The Thin Green Line

Aqua Line (disambiguation)
Black line (disambiguation)
Blue Line (disambiguation)
Light Blue Line (disambiguation)
Brown Line (disambiguation)
Gold Line (disambiguation)
Gray Line (disambiguation)
Green Line (disambiguation)
Light Green Line (disambiguation)
Magenta Line (disambiguation)
Orange Line (disambiguation)
Pink Line (disambiguation)
Purple Line (disambiguation)
Red Line (disambiguation)
Silver Line (disambiguation)
Teal Line (disambiguation)
Turquoise Line (disambiguation)
Violet Line (disambiguation)
White Line (disambiguation)
Yellow Line (disambiguation)
