= Purple Line =

Purple Line may refer to:

== Public transit ==
=== Africa ===
- Purple Line (Lagos Transit)

=== Asia ===
==== India ====
- Line 3 (Chennai Metro), Chennai, India
- Purple Line (Namma Metro), Bengaluru, India
- Purple Line (Kolkata Metro), India
- Purple Line (Mumbai Metro), India
- Purple Line (Pune Metro), India

==== Others ====
- Purple Line (Bangkok), Thailand
- Purple Line (Dubai Metro), Dubai Metro
- Tseung Kwan O line, Hong Kong
- LRT Line 2 (Metro Manila), Manila, Philippines
- Line 6 (Riyadh Metro), Riyadh, Saudi Arabia, Also referred to as Violet Line
- Seoul Subway Line 5, Seoul, South Korea
- North East Line, Singapore
- Taoyuan Airport MRT, Taoyuan, Taiwan
- Purple Line (Tel Aviv Light Rail), light-rail line under construction in Tel Aviv, Israel

=== United Kingdom ===
- Sheffield Supertram Purple Line, a tram line in Sheffield, England
- Elizabeth Line, London, England

=== Germany ===
- U6 (Berlin U-Bahn), Berlin

=== North America ===
- Purple Line (CTA), an elevated train line in Chicago, Illinois, U.S.
- Purple Line (IndyGo), a bus rapid transit line in Indianapolis, Indiana, U.S.
- Purple Line (Maryland), a light rail line currently under construction in Maryland counties bordering Washington, D.C.
- Purple Line (Mexico City Metro), Mexico
- Purple Line (Mexico City Metrobús), Mexico
- Purple Line (San Diego Trolley), a proposed light rail line in San Diego County, California, U.S.
- Purple Line (Pittsburgh), Pittsburgh, Pennsylvania, U.S.
- E Line (RTD), a light rail line in and near Denver, Colorado, U.S.
- N Line (RTD), a commuter rail line in and near Denver, Colorado, U.S.
- IRT Flushing Line, a rapid transit line in New York City, serving the 7 <7> trains
- M (SEPTA Metro), Norristown High Speed Line or Purple Line, an interurban light rapid transit line near Philadelphia, Pennsylvania, U.S.
- MBTA Commuter Rail or Purple Line, in the Boston area, Massachusetts, U.S.
- Line 4 Sheppard, a subway line in Toronto, Ontario, Canada
- Viva Purple, a bus rapid transit line in the Regional Municipality of York, Ontario, Canada
- D Line (Los Angeles Metro), a subway line in Los Angeles, California, U.S.
- Metro Bronze Line (Minnesota), formerly Purple Line, proposed bus rapid transit line in Saint Paul, Minnesota, U.S.
- Purple Line (BART), former rapid transit line serving San Francisco International Airport, California, U.S.
- Purple Line (VTA), former light rail line in San Jose, California, U.S.

== Road transportation ==
- Purple Belt (Pittsburgh), Pittsburgh, Pennsylvania

== Other uses ==
- Purple Line (ceasefire line), the 1967 ceasefire line on the Golan Heights
- "Purple Line" (song), a 2008 song by TVXQ
- The Purple Line, the debut novel of Indian author, Priyamvada N Purushotham
- Line of purples, a part of the CIE chromaticity diagram

== See also ==
- Line of purples, a concept in color theory

Aqua Line (disambiguation)
Black line (disambiguation)
Blue Line (disambiguation)
Light Blue Line (disambiguation)
Brown Line (disambiguation)
Gold Line (disambiguation)
Gray Line (disambiguation)
Green Line (disambiguation)
Light Green Line (disambiguation)
Magenta Line (disambiguation)
Orange Line (disambiguation)
Pink Line (disambiguation)
Purple Line (disambiguation)
Red Line (disambiguation)
Silver Line (disambiguation)
Teal Line (disambiguation)
Turquoise Line (disambiguation)
Violet Line (disambiguation)
White Line (disambiguation)
Yellow Line (disambiguation)
