= Turquoise Line =

Turquoise Line or Blue Green Line may refer to:

- Turquoise Line (London)
- Turquoise Line (New York)
- Turquoise Line (Paris)
- Turquoise Line (Vancouver)
- Blue Green Line (Moscow)
- Line 16 (Shanghai Metro)
- Line 18 (Chongqing Rail Transit)
- Line 10 (São Paulo), São Paulo, Brazil

== See also ==
Aqua Line (disambiguation)
Black line (disambiguation)
Blue Line (disambiguation)
Light Blue Line (disambiguation)
Brown Line (disambiguation)
Gold Line (disambiguation)
Gray Line (disambiguation)
Green Line (disambiguation)
Light Green Line (disambiguation)
Magenta Line (disambiguation)
Orange Line (disambiguation)
Pink Line (disambiguation)
Purple Line (disambiguation)
Red Line (disambiguation)
Silver Line (disambiguation)
Teal Line (disambiguation)
Turquoise Line (disambiguation)
Violet Line (disambiguation)
White Line (disambiguation)
Yellow Line (disambiguation)
