= Gold Line =

Gold Line, Gold line, or Goldline may refer to:

== Transportation ==
=== Rail ===
- Gold Line (MARTA), a rapid transit line in Atlanta, Georgia
- Gold Line (Doha Metro), a rapid transit line of the Doha Metro
- Gold Line (Mumbai Metro), a rapid transit line of the Mumbai Metro
- Gold Line (Dubai Metro), a rapid transit line of the Dubai Metro
- Gold Line (SacRT), a light rail line in Sacramento, California
- CityLynx Gold Line, a streetcar line in Charlotte, North Carolina
- Gold Line (Bangkok), an automated people mover in Bangkok, Thailand
- Gimpo Goldline, a light metro line of the Seoul Metropolitan Subway
- Line 17 (São Paulo Metro), also referred to as the Ouro (Gold) Line, future São Paulo monorail line
- G Line (RTD), a commuter rail line in Denver, Colorado known as the Gold Line during construction
- E Line (Los Angeles Metro), color-coded "gold", a light rail line in Los Angeles County, California
  - L Line (Los Angeles Metro), known as the Gold Line from its inception in 2003 until 2020, a former light rail line in Los Angeles County, California, later merged into the A Line and E Line in 2023.
- Tokyo Metro Yūrakuchō Line, color-coded "gold", a rapid transit line in Tokyo, Japan
- Line 11 (Guangzhou Metro), color-coded "gold", a rapid transit line in Guangzhou, China
- Line 12 (Madrid Metro), color-coded "gold", a rapid transit line southwest of Madrid, Spain
- Mexico City Metro Line 3, color-coded "gold", a rapid transit line in Mexico City, Mexico
- Imazatosuji Line, color-coded "orange-gold", a rapid transit line in Osaka, Japan
- Paris Metro Line 10, color-coded "gold", a rapid transit line in Paris, France
- Seoul Subway Line 9, color-coded "gold", a rapid transit line in Seoul, South Korea

=== Bus ===
- Travel Washington's Gold Line, an intercity bus line in Washington state
- Goldline, a brand of Ulsterbus, Northern Ireland
- Goldline Travel, a brand of Reading Buses, England
- Stagecoach Goldline, a brand of the Stagecoach Group, United Kingdom
- Gold Line (Washington, D.C.), a brand of commuter bus service in the Washington, D.C. area operated by Martz Group
- Metro Gold Line (Minnesota), a bus rapid transit line in St. Paul, Minnesota

== Retailers ==
- Goldline International, a retail seller of gold and silver coins, and precious metals for investors and collectors

== Zoology ==
- Salema porgy (Sarpa salpa), an East Atlantic and Mediterranean fish also known as goldline
- Goldline darter, threatened due to water quality degradation on the Cahaba River
- Goldline blenny

== Other ==
- Gold line (diving), a permanent yellow distance line leading out of the flooded section of a cave

== See also ==
Aqua Line (disambiguation)
Black line (disambiguation)
Blue Line (disambiguation)
Light Blue Line (disambiguation)
Brown Line (disambiguation)
Gold Line (disambiguation)
Gray Line (disambiguation)
Green Line (disambiguation)
Light Green Line (disambiguation)
Magenta Line (disambiguation)
Orange Line (disambiguation)
Pink Line (disambiguation)
Purple Line (disambiguation)
Red Line (disambiguation)
Silver Line (disambiguation)
Teal Line (disambiguation)
Turquoise Line (disambiguation)
Violet Line (disambiguation)
White Line (disambiguation)
Yellow Line (disambiguation)
