= Orange Line =

Orange Line may refer to:

== Public transit ==
=== Asia ===
==== India ====
- Orange Line (Mumbai Metro), Thane, India
- Orange Line (Namma Metro), Bengaluru, India
- Line 4 (Chennai Metro), Chennai, India
- Orange Line (Jaipur Metro), Jaipur, India
- Orange Line (Kanpur Metro), Kanpur, India
- Orange Line (Kolkata Metro), Kolkata, India
- Orange Line (Nagpur Metro), Nagpur, India
- Airport Express Line (Delhi Metro), Delhi, India

==== South Korea ====
- Line 1 (Busan), South Korea
- Line 2 (Incheon), South Korea
- Line 3 (Seoul), South Korea
- U Line, Uijeongbu, South Korea

==== Others ====
- Orange Line (Bangkok), a planned line in Bangkok, Thailand
- Tung Chung line, Hong Kong, China
- Jakarta LRT, Jakarta, Indonesia
- Orange Line, KMRT, Kaohsiung, Taiwan
- Ampang Line, Kuala Lumpur, Malayasia
- Orange Line (Lahore Metro) in Lahore, Pakistan
- PNR Metro South Commuter Line, Manila, Philippines
- Line 3 (Riyadh Metro), Riyadh, Saudi Arabia
- Circle Line (Singapore), Singapore
- Zhonghe-Xinlu Line of Taipei Metro, Taipei, Taiwan

=== Europe ===
- Kaluzhsko-Rizhskaya line, Moscow, Russia
- London Overground, London, UK
- Paris Metro Line 5, Paris, France
- Brussels Metro line 2, Brussels, Belgium
- Line 7 (Madrid Metro), Madrid, Spain
- Barcelona Metro line 9, Barcelona, Spain
- U9 (Berlin U-Bahn), Berlin, Germany

=== North America ===
- Broad Street Line, Philadelphia, Pennsylvania
- Line 5 Eglinton, a light rail line in Toronto, Ontario, Canada
- MAX Orange Line (TriMet), a light rail line in Portland, Oregon
- Orange Line (CTA), Chicago, Illinois
- Orange Line (DART), a light rail line in Dallas, Texas
- G Line (Los Angeles Metro), a busway line in Los Angeles, California formerly known as Orange Line
- Orange Line (MBTA), Boston, Massachusetts
- Orange Line, Metrorail, Florida
- Metro Orange Line (Minnesota), a bus rapid transit line serving Minneapolis, Minnesota
- Orange Line (Montreal Metro), Montreal, Quebec, Canada
- Orange Line (San Diego Trolley), San Diego, California
- Orange Line (Sound Transit), a streetcar line in Tacoma, Washington, United States
- Orange Line (Washington Metro), Washington, DC
- Orange Line (BART), San Francisco Bay Area, California
- Viva Orange, York Region, Ontario, Canada
- IND Sixth Avenue Line in New York City, colored orange on maps, which carries the B D F M trains
  - Orange B Line
  - Orange D Line
  - Orange F Line
  - Orange M Line
- Orange Line (VTA), a light rail in Santa Clara County, California
- Orange Line (CapMetro), a planned light rail line in Austin, Texas
- Orange Line (Mexico City Metro)
- C Line (RTD), a former light rail line in the Denver metropolitan area, Colorado

=== South America ===
- Line 6 (São Paulo Metro), São Paulo, Brazil
- Line 1 (Rio de Janeiro), Rio de Janeiro, Brazil

== Road transportation ==
- Orange Belt (Pittsburgh), Pittsburgh, Pennsylvania

== See also ==
Aqua Line (disambiguation)
Black line (disambiguation)
Blue Line (disambiguation)
Light Blue Line (disambiguation)
Brown Line (disambiguation)
Gold Line (disambiguation)
Gray Line (disambiguation)
Green Line (disambiguation)
Light Green Line (disambiguation)
Magenta Line (disambiguation)
Orange Line (disambiguation)
Pink Line (disambiguation)
Purple Line (disambiguation)
Red Line (disambiguation)
Silver Line (disambiguation)
Teal Line (disambiguation)
Turquoise Line (disambiguation)
Violet Line (disambiguation)
White Line (disambiguation)
Yellow Line (disambiguation)
