= Blue Route =

Blue Route may refer to:

- Blue Route (Nova Scotia), a cycling network under construction in the province of Nova Scotia
- A section of Interstate 476, a highway in Pennsylvania, locally nicknamed the "Blue Route"

== See also ==
- Blue Line (disambiguation)
- Blue belt (disambiguation)
