= Redline Communications =

Canadian information technology company

Redline Communications Group
- Type: Subsidiary
- Traded as: TSX: RDL
- Industry: Communication equipment
- Founded: Markham, ON (1999)
- Headquarters: Town Centre Blvd, Markham, ON, Canada
- Key people: Stephen Sorocky, CEO; Joan Ritchie, CFO
- Products: Wireless broadband network equipment
- Revenue: ▲27.1 million CDN (2018)
- Number of employees: 100 Employees - Worldwide
- Website: rdlcom.com

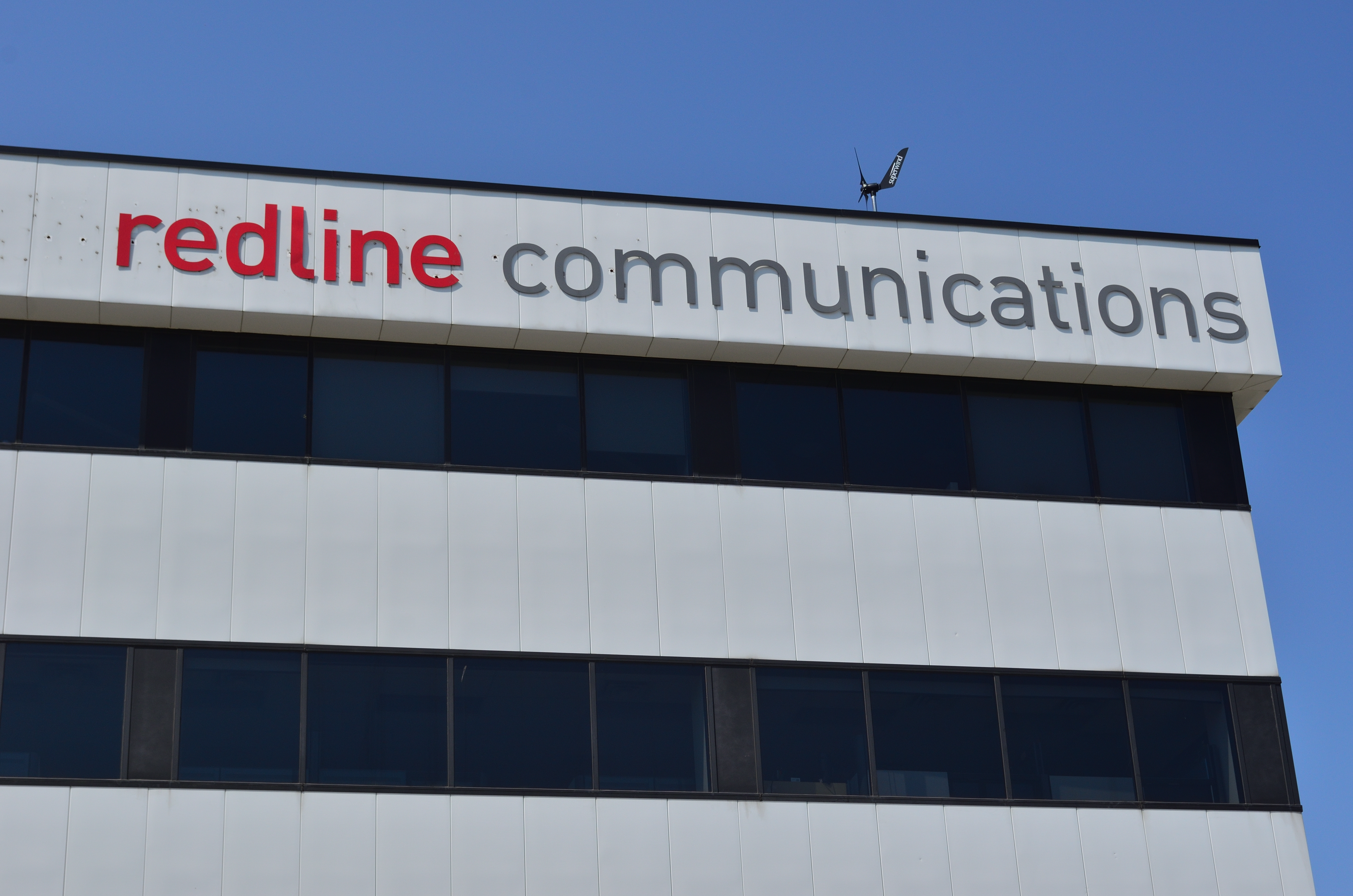
Redline Communications HQ in Markham

Redline is a multinational wireless communications network designer and manufacturer headquartered in Markham, Ontario, Canada. It also maintains offices and operations in Florida, California, Romania and Oman.

Redline Communications develops and sells wide-area industrial networks that operate over wide geographic areas. Redline sells wireless terminals that provide TCP/IP transport for fixed, portable and full-motion terrestrial and seaborne deployments as well as software, tools and services.

Redline Communications’ products and technologies are used in a variety of markets and industries, including Oil and Gas, Military, Government and Telecom Service providers. The company's networks are sold directly to end customers, and its wireless terminals are sold indirectly though resellers.

== History ==
Redline was founded in 1999. Redline's first product, the AN-50 point-to-point wireless Ethernet bridge, was launched in February 2002.

In October 2007, Redline Communications was listed on the Toronto Stock Exchange. While Redline's value grew quickly in its earlier years, growth tapered off shortly after their 2007 IPO, with shares on the Toronto Stock Exchange falling from a 2007 high of $6.50 to under $0.30 by 2009.

With the discovery of accounting irregularities in April 2010, Redline’s stock was cease-traded. In August 2010 it restated its revenues for the four years 2006 to 2009. Also in 2010, Redline Communications, along with KPMG LLP, its accountants at the time, was served with a class action lawsuit by investors alleging Redline overstated profits and downplayed costs in its financial statements. The case settled in Sept 2011 and in November 2011 the Ontario Superior Court approved the agreement of a $3.1 million payment by Redline Communications and $500,000 by KPMG, neither of which admitted liability.

Eric Melka, formerly president of Redline shareholder Telemedia Inc., became the company’s permanent CEO in January 2011, replacing the management team and reducing overall staff. The company’s market emphasis shifted to oil and gas which by the end of 2012 represented 50% of the company’s revenue. Melka's departure was announced in October 2012, citing health reasons. In December 2013, Robert Williams was appointed Redline CEO.

On September 9, 2014, Redline Communications announced its purchase of the assets of PureWave Networks for $2 million.

In July 2022, Redline Communications was acquired by Aviat Networks and delisted from the Toronto Stock Exchange.

== Patents and technology ==
Redline products are based on a Universal Wireless Technology (UWT) platform, a technology based on OFDM and developed by Redline. It serves as the foundation for a product family that operate both point-to-point and point-to multipoint to distribute high-capacity low-latency IP communications across wide areas and wide spectrum ranges.

== Awards and recognition ==
Redline was ranked 88th on the Branham Group Inc's list of 2015 Top 250 Canadian ICT Companies and 6th on the list of 2015 Top Canadian Wireless Solutions Companies

In January 2013, Redline was awarded the 2012 BSI Canada Award of Excellence for successful application of international standards helping to achieve record profits two years ahead of schedule.

Redline was recognized as the Comeback Company of the Year for 2013 by BestinBiz

In November 2012, Redline RAS Nomadic Platform was recognized by the Fierce Innovations Award program as the winner in the category of Backhaul Innovation

== See also ==
- Mobile data terminal
