= Punainen viiva =

Punainen viiva (Finnish for "Red Line") can refer to:

- Punainen viiva (book), a 1909 book by Ilmari Kianto and basis of the below film and opera
- Red Line (1959 film), a film by Matti Kassila
- The Red Line, an opera by Aulis Sallinen

== See also ==
- Red Line (disambiguation)
