= Magenta Line =

Magenta Line may refer to:

- K Line (Los Angeles Metro), Los Angeles, California
- Magenta Line (Delhi Metro), Delhi, India
- Magenta Line (Mumbai Metro), Mumbai, India
- Magenta Line (Paris), Paris Metro, France
- Magenta Line (São Paulo Metro), Brazil
- Magenta Line (Shanghai), China
- The Metropolitan line of the London Underground
- West Rail line, former railway line in Hong Kong, China

== See also ==
Black line (disambiguation)
Blue Line (disambiguation)
Light Blue Line (disambiguation)
Brown Line (disambiguation)
Gold Line (disambiguation)
Gray Line (disambiguation)
Green Line (disambiguation)
Light Green Line (disambiguation)
Magenta Line (disambiguation)
Orange Line (disambiguation)
Pink Line (disambiguation)
Purple Line (disambiguation)
Red Line (disambiguation)
Silver Line (disambiguation)
Teal Line (disambiguation)
Turquoise Line (disambiguation)
Violet Line (disambiguation)
White Line (disambiguation)
Yellow Line (disambiguation)
