= Blue belt =

Blue belt may refer to:

- The Blue Belt, a Norwegian fairy tale
- Blue Belt (Pittsburgh), the Allegheny County road belt system
- Blue belt, a rank in martial arts (see Kyū)
  - Blue belt (Brazilian Jiu-Jitsu), a level in the Brazilian jiu-jitsu ranking system
- Blue Belt Programme, a marine protection and sustainable management programme of the British Overseas Territories
- Staten Island Bluebelt, a storm water management system

== See also ==
- Blue Line (disambiguation)
- Blue Route (disambiguation)
