= White line fever =

White line fever may refer to:

- Highway hypnosis, an altered mental state induced by driving great distances
- White Line Fever (film), a 1975 American film
- "White Line Fever", a 1969 song by Merle Haggard from his album Okie from Muskogee
- "White Line Fever", a 1977 song by Motörhead from their debut album Motörhead
- White Line Fever (TV series), an Australian-rules football show
- White Line Fever (book), a 2002 autobiography by Lemmy
- White Line Fever, a 2020 album by Emery
