= Blackline Safety =

Canadian Connected Safety Technology Manufacturer

Blackline Safety Corp.
- Formerly: Blackline GPS Corp. (2004-2015)
- Company type: Public
- Traded as: TSX: BLN
- Industry: Connected Safety Technology
- Founded: 2004; 22 years ago
- Founders: Patrick Rousseau; Brendon Cook
- Area served: Worldwide
- Key people: Cody Slater (CEO)
- Products: Personal Gas detector Area Gas detector Wearable Safety Device; Lone Worker Safety Device; Gamma Radiation Detector; 24/7 Live Monitoring
- Revenue: ▲CAD$ 100 million (FY 2023)
- Website: blacklinesafety.com

Blackline Safety Corp. (formerly Blackline GPS) is a Canadian public company that designs, develops and manufactures employee safety monitoring technology. It is traded under the symbol BLN on the TSX Venture Exchange.

== History ==
The company started out as Blackline GPS, founded by Patrick Rousseau and Brendon Cook in 2004. They introduced a car-tracking device that uses GPS in 2008. Named GPS Snitch, it can be controlled via the internet or by texting to a special phone number.

Another offering from Blackline is named Blip.

The idea for the initial product originated in 2004, but success was limited by the lack of a reliable income stream. Outside funding enabled growth in the consumer market, but by 2010 "the decision was made to leave the consumer GPS market, and focus solely on the industrial GPS market".

In 2013 85% of the company's income was from consumer sales, but in 2018 85% was from industrial sales.

In 2014, the company received a contract of $240,000 CAD from the Canadian government under the Build in Canada Innovation Program. They worked with Correctional Services Canada in Ontario to outfit parole officers with about 100 of its Loner 900/Loner Bridge System monitors.

The company changed names in July 2015 to Blackline Safety Corp.

=== Income stream ===
The company requires either monthly or annual fees. Success is based on having an ongoing income stream, and a 2013 report noted that simply getting more customers is not enough.

== See also ==
- LoJack
- OnStar
