= Lynx Red Line =

Proposed commuter rail service in the Charlotte metropolitan area

Overview
- Status: Planning phase
- Locale: Charlotte, Cornelius, Davidson, Huntersville, and Mount Mourne, NC
- Termini: Gateway Station; Mount Mourne
- Stations: 8

Service
- Type: Commuter rail
- System: Charlotte Area Transit System

History
- Opened: 2035 (tentative)

Technical
- Line length: 25 miles (40 km)

The Lynx Red Line is a proposed commuter rail service, connecting the towns in northern Mecklenburg and southern Iredell counties to Uptown Charlotte, North Carolina. In 2019, after a reevaluation of the entire corridor, the Charlotte Area Transit System (CATS) decided to move forward with BRT and shelve the commuter rail, the decision of which was met with frustration by various city leaders and impacted residents.

Since February 3, 2020, MetroRAPID, a rebranding and overhauling of four existing express bus routes, has been setup to utilize the I-77 express lanes, which were completed in 2019. The line was projected to begin operations in 2029, but the city of Charlotte remained interested in a commuter rail option along a section of the Norfolk Southern O Line.

In August 2024, the city announced that they reached an agreement to purchase 22 miles of Norfolk Southern right-of-way and land near the future Charlotte Gateway Station for $91 million, pending approvals. As of 2026, design of the Red Line is scheduled to be at 30% by the end of 2027, thanks to the Charlotte City Council approving the next stage of planning.

== History ==
=== Commuter rail ===
The Red Line was a planned ten station commuter rail that was to connect between Mount Mourne in southern Iredell County and the proposed Gateway Station in Uptown Charlotte. It would primarily serve the towns of Huntersville, Cornelius, and Davidson in northern Mecklenburg County.

It would be routed along the existing Norfolk Southern O Line right-of-way, roughly paralleling North Graham Street and North Carolina Highway 115, as it extends through north Mecklenburg County, and was estimated to be 25 miles (40 km) in length. Originally, it was thought to cost $261 million to complete the first phase by 2012 and an additional $112 million to complete phase two by 2019; the line would contain 1,200 parking spaces and 10 stations along the corridor. However, several issues have arisen that have increased the project's price tag,

==== Design and planning ====
By 2011, the Lynx Red Line was planned to be built in one phase. Due to less revenue in the transit tax, in January the Metropolitan Transit Commission voted that the Lynx Red Line along with the Blue Line extension were the top two priorities, leaving the streetcar to be funded by the city and postponing further work on the Lynx Silver Line and the Airport corridor until after the Red Line and Blue line projects were completed. The Red Line was projected to be in operation by mid to late 2018.

==== Feasibility ====
By June 2011 the project had been 90% designed and an operating agreement was signed with Norfolk Southern, but the project lacked nearly 80% of the needed funds to begin construction. In October 2012, The Charlotte Observer noted that "the Red Line...has little chance of federal funding, and CATS may not have enough money to pay for even a portion of construction costs. The NCDOT is working on creative ways to finance the project, but it appears to be years away."

On October 17, 2012, the NCDOT, the Red Line Task Force and CATS requested Norfolk Southern to conduct a study of the "Red Line" concept. As the Red Line would utilize the NS O-Line between Charlotte and Mooresville, the study would determine if and how both freight and passenger services could use the same line while allowing normal freight services to continue. It was estimated at a meeting of the task force on October 24 that the study would be initiated by late January 2013 and completed by early 2014, after which further feasibility studies and projections could be made. However, in early 2013, Norfolk Southern expressed its doubts that the $416 million project would be feasible.

On June 25, 2014, following the completion and release of the feasibility study, CATS officials said that the Red Line would be too costly and complicated to build. Several reasons were provided, including:

- The continued refusal of Norfolk Southern to share its existing trackage with CATS, necessitating the construction of a new railway line parallel to the NS rails. This would increase the overall project cost by $215 million and cause "multiple disruptions to adjacent communities", as building a parallel rail line would involve construction costs, right-of-way purchases, and the complete rebuilding of all road intersections along the proposed line.
- The project's ineligibility for federal funding due to low ridership projections.
- The inability of CATS to fund the Red Line on its own.

Despite the negative assessments of the feasibility study, the Metropolitan Transit Commission, including the Red Line task force, did not take any official steps to disband the project. While the director of the NCDOT rail division, Paul Worley, said that he would work with Norfolk Southern officials to begin a study concerning the proposed Gateway Station, he said that the Red Line concept would not be included, as "no viable plan" for it now existed. Though the mayor of Davidson, John Woods, said the results of the feasibility study were "a serious setback," he added that developing transit in the northern portion of Mecklenburg County remained important for the region, and one possible alternative to a commuter rail line could be bus rapid transit.

Charlotte city officials have continued to maintain a strong interest in the original Red Line project. In June 2021, Charlotte city manager Marcus Jones said the Red Line remained the city's "top priority" within the overall regional transit plan. A financial consulting firm has advised the Charlotte city council that the Red Line as originally planned could begin operating in 2031, and could be built for $674 million. Municipal leaders in North Mecklenburg communities, however, including Cornelius mayor Jeff Tarte, oppose future transit taxes and projects led by Charlotte officials, are skeptical Norfolk Southern will change its stance on sharing its lines with a commuter rail, and have doubted the long-term viability of diesel-powered locomotive technology.

=== North Corridor reevaluation ===
In July 2018, CATS began a reevaluation of the Red Line and three alternative options to replace it if still not feasible. The process involved a series of public meetings and various surveys to know where the public stands regarding the Red Line and how each of the alternative options rank. After conducting a survey to elicit public opinion on the Lynx Red Line, CATS announced in January 2019 that plans for either a commuter or light rail between Uptown and Mooresville were not feasible. In the short term, CATS will run express buses along the I-77 Express lanes. Service would be expanded to true bus rapid transit (BRT) by 2029, when the service is projected to begin.

=== Letter of understanding ===
In June 2024, a letter of understanding was made that announced the City of Charlotte plans to purchase a section of the O-Line between Charlotte and Mooresville. In it, the city plans to establish a commuter rail service, while Norfolk Southern will continue providing freight service. This is a reversal from both Norfolk Southern and CATS; both of which saw the red line as not feasible in 2013 and 2019 respectively. The news of the agreement came a day after the Charlotte City Council approved a revised agreement managing the region's public transit system. A few weeks after the announcement, state lawmakers passed a law stating that the City of Charlotte cannot buy land outside Mecklenburg County without the approval of each county and municipality first. This was brought on because Iredell County leaders were surprised to learn that the City of Charlotte wanted to acquire right-of-way all the way into downtown Mooresville, further than the current 25-mile (40 km) Lynx Red Line plan. While the city planned to work with both Iredell County and Mooresville officials, the law "formalizes the engagement that the city was planning to do," Charlotte spokesman Lawrence Corley said.

=== Track and land purchase ===
In August 2024, city officials briefed the City Council on a proposed purchase of right of way and land to facilitate future Red Line service. The agreement would include 1.6 acres of land near the Gateway Station project and 22 miles of rail corridor from Norfolk Southern. The agreement requires approval by the City Council and ratification of a proposed 1-cent sales tax that would be used to repay the cost of the purchase.

After the sales tax was approved by the voters in November 2025, on March 9, 2026, the Charlotte City Council unanimously approved the next phase of the design process for the Red Line. According to councilwoman Dimple Ajmera, this phase would "finalize station locations, engineering details and updated costs." As of March 2026, the Red Line's planning stage is expected to be 30% complete by the end of 2027.
