= PureWave Networks =

PureWave Networks, Inc
- Type: Private
- Founded: 2003
- Defunct: 2014
- Fate: Acquired by Redline Communications
- Headquarters: Santa Clara, California
- Products: Quantum 6600, Quantum 2200
- Number of employees: 35
- Website: www.pwnets.com

PureWave Networks was a developer of advanced, 4G LTE and WiMAX base stations. Based in Santa Clara, California, PureWave Networks is a privately held company that was founded in 2003. The company was backed by Silicon Valley venture firms including Allegis Capital, Benahmou Global Ventures, ATA Ventures, Core Capital and Leapfrog Ventures. PureWave's line of Mobile WiMAX 802.16e base stations were sold in a variety of licensed frequencies. In 2014, Purewave's Quantum WiMAX product line was acquired by one of its customers, Mercury Networks and the remaining company assets were sold to Redline Communications for a cash purchase price of US$2 million.

== History ==
Established in 2003, PureWave specializes in developing high-performance, compact, outdoor base stations for 4G wireless networks. In 2009 PureWave introduced the PureWave Quantum family of mobile WiMAX base stations with the PureWave Quantum 1000. It was followed in 2010 and 2011 by PureWave Quantum 6600 and PureWave Quantum 2200, respectively. PureWave uses an open product architecture that allows operators to build their networks using equipment from multiple vendors, utilizing any end user device that conforms to the 802.16e standard. PureWave is developing a portfolio of 4G LTE small cell base stations that will support both TD-LTE and FDD-LTE. In 2012 the company relocated its headquarters from Mountain View, CA to Santa Clara, CA.

== Products and Technology ==
=== PureWave Quantum Base Stations ===
The PureWave Quantum family of products consists of two product lines: PureWave Quantum 2200 and PureWave Quantum 6600. Both product lines can be deployed outdoors, and share the same enclosure, software code and functionality.

=== LTE Base Stations ===
PureWave is currently developing a portfolio of small cell 4G LTE base stations.

== Current Deployments ==
The following is a selection of customers and deployments publicly announced by PureWave: See also list of deployed WiMAX networks

- Mercury Wireless, covering 4000 square miles of rural Kansas
- AireArk - 15,000 business and residential customers in Arkansas
- EMAXX Telecom, the operator has announced plans to serve 150,000 customers across Cambodia
- Scarlet, 8,000 customers in Aruba, St. Maarten and Curaçao
- City of Chanute, Kansas, Smart Grid Deployment, 5,400 electric and 4,400 gas and water customers, city-owned utility, Southeast Kansas
- Cal-Ore, covering 200 square miles, rural California and Oregon

== Awards ==
- WISPA Product of the Year Award, 2011, PureWave Quantum 6600
