= Blue Line (Jerusalem Light Rail) =

Future light rail line in Jerusalem

Overview
- Status: Under Construction
- Locale: Jerusalem
- Termini: Ramot Alon; Gilo
- Stations: 53

Service
- Type: Tram
- Depot(s): Malha depot
- Daily ridership: 250,000 (estimated)

History
- Planned opening: 2030

Technical
- Line length: 31 km (19 mi)
- Number of tracks: 2
- Track gauge: 1,435 mm (4 ft 8 1/2 in) standard gauge
- Electrification: 750 V DC OHLE

The Blue Line is the third line of the Jerusalem Light Rail. While initial preparatory infrastructure work began in 2020, major construction on the central sections began in 2025.

The line, which will operate from Gilo through a tunnel running 2 kilometres (1.2 mi) through King George Street in the center of Jerusalem and on to Ramot, is expected to be completed in stages, with initial service in 2028 and full operations projected for 2030 that would include branches labeled Azure and Purple.

== History ==
Originally approved in 2017, the planned 22 kilometres (14 mi) Blue Line was expected to be completed by 2023. Construction began in September 2025, with a plan to complete some time after 2029 a system covering 24 kilometres (15 mi) and 40 stations that would serve 250,000 passengers each day.
