= Kannapolis station =

Passenger train station in North Carolina

Kannapolis, NC
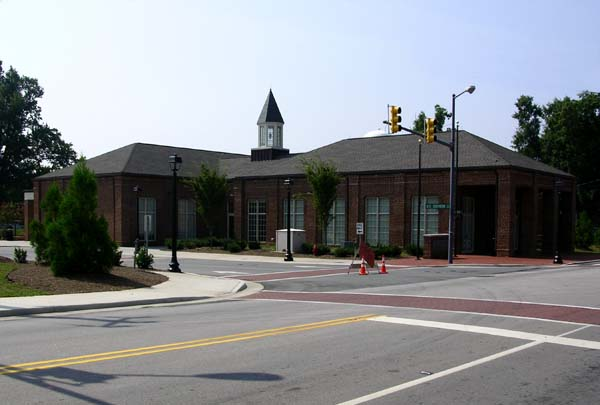
- Kannapolis station in August 2006

General information
- Location: 201 South Main Street; Kannapolis, North Carolina; United States
- Coordinates: 35°29′46″N 80°37′29″W
- Owner: City of Kannapolis
- Lines: NCRR Corridor; Charlotte District
- Platforms: 1 side platform
- Tracks: 2
- Connections: Rider: Blue, Brown

Construction
- Structure type: At-grade
- Parking: 34 spaces
- Accessible: Yes
- Architect: Gomes & Staub
- Architectural style: Colonial Revival

Other information
- Status: Unstaffed; attendant available
- Station code: Amtrak: KAN

History
- Opened: 2004

Passengers
- FY 2025: 41,333 (Amtrak)

Services
Preceding station	Amtrak	Following station
Charlotte Terminus	Carolinian	Salisbury toward New York
Charlotte Terminus	Piedmont	Salisbury toward Raleigh
Crescent does not stop here
Location

Kannapolis station is an Amtrak train station in Kannapolis, North Carolina, United States. It is located at 201 South Main Street, within walking distance of Atrium Health Ballpark and the North Carolina Research Campus, in downtown Kannapolis.

== History ==
This facility was completed in December 2004 to serve as a permanent replacement for the temporary facility that was across the parking lot from where the current facility rests. The station blends with the existing architecture of downtown Kannapolis, with Gomes & Staub serving as architect and Titus Construction serving as general contractor.

== Services ==
The station, operated by Amtrak, is served by eight trains per day.

- The Carolinian, is both the first train, towards New York, and the last train, towards Charlotte.
- The Piedmont, a regional companion of the Carolinian that runs three round-trips between Raleigh and Charlotte.

The facility is open daily at 6:30am–1:00pm and at 3:00pm–8:30pm; it includes Quik-Trak kiosks, waiting area and restrooms. No baggage service is available at this station.
