= Lynx Silver Line =

Proposed light rail service in Charlotte, North Carolina

Overview
- Status: Pre-project development
- Locale: Belmont, Charlotte, Matthews, Stallings and Indian Trail, NC
- Termini: Belmont (west); Indian Trail (east)
- Stations: 31 (tentative)

Service
- Type: Light rail
- System: Charlotte Area Transit System

History
- Planned opening: 2037 (tentative)

Technical
- Line length: 29 mi (47 km)

The Lynx Silver Line is a proposed east–west light rail line in Charlotte, North Carolina. The Silver Line would connect the outlying cities and towns of Belmont, Matthews, Stallings and Indian Trail to Uptown Charlotte and the Charlotte Douglas International Airport. In the refined locally preferred alternative (LPA), released in early 2021, the route is estimated to be around 29 miles (47 km), with 29 stations and one maintenance facility.

The proposed light rail route was a merger of two earlier projects known as the Southeast Corridor, a proposed light rail line between Uptown Charlotte and CPCC Levine Campus in Matthews, and the West Corridor, a proposed streetcar line between Charlotte-Douglas International Airport and Uptown Charlotte.

== History ==
=== Southeast Corridor ===
The prospect of developing a light rail line between Matthews and Uptown along Independence Boulevard was initially evaluated in 1985. By 1997, the Charlotte City Council voted, at the recommendation of an independent transit panel, for the development of a busway in the median of Independence in lieu of light rail. The decision to develop a busway over light rail was based on overall costs of $126 million for a busway versus $300 million for light-rail. However, by 1999 delays in the construction of the busway resulted in a renewed grassroots effort of rail advocates to have light rail placed along Independence. As a result of this campaign, Representative Robin Hayes, who served as a member of the House Transportation Committee, to design the busway in such a manner as to be adapted for light rail when it can be economically justified. In 2002, the Metropolitan Transit Commission (MTC) recommended that the Independence corridor see the construction, but that as part of the initial engineering studies, light rail accommodation be considered.

By 2006, a study released by the Charlotte Area Transit System indicated that the cost of light rail along the corridor would be roughly double that of a busway and have fewer riders. The estimates stated light rail on Independence would be 12.7 miles (20.4 km) in length at a cost of $585 million, with a projected ridership of 14,400 in 2030; and stated a busway would be 13.5 miles (21.7 km) in length at a cost of $315 to $325 million, with a projected ridership of 16,000 in 2030. In September, the MTC voted to delay on determining whether a busway or light rail should be built along the corridor until 2011.

By October 2012, the MTC had voted in favor of a busway on interior lanes of the highway. However, in May 2013, a 30-member funding task force suggested a light rail line instead, at an estimated cost of $1.7 billion. The 2006 study had estimated the line would be 13.5 miles (21.7 km) and be complete through Idlewild Road by 2022, to Sardis Road North by 2024 and finally to CPCC Levine by 2026. Additionally, the line would contain 3,350 parking spaces and 16 stations along the corridor at a cost of $582 million.

In September 2016, after three years of further studies and consultations with area residents, CATS settled on light rail as the most viable option for the Silver Line. At the time, however, CATS lacked any further sources of funding to invest in future projects. John Lewis, the system's CEO, said he would wait for the Blue Line Extension to begin service in August 2017 before resuming discussions on how best to fund the new lines. A possible option could be to have neighboring counties contribute towards project costs. The Silver Line would come within less than a mile of the Union County border at the CPCC Levine Station. Lynx Silver Line will have 13 stations with about 10 having park-and-ride lots.

In January 2019, CATS announced that the Silver Line would cross from Independence Boulevard over to 11th Street, run parallel to I-277 to North Graham Street, then turn south to link to the planned Gateway Station and continuation along the West Corridor.

=== West Corridor ===
The West Corridor was proposed as a streetcar line to serve as an extension for the LYNX network in Charlotte, North Carolina, initially slated for completion by 2034. It would connect Charlotte-Douglas International Airport in west Charlotte with the Charlotte Transportation Center in Uptown Charlotte. It was to follow a primarily east–west path along West Morehead Street and Wilkinson Boulevard, through west Charlotte. The first phase was estimated to be 6.4 miles (10.3 km) with 10 stops. It was to be completed between Uptown and Ashley Road by 2029 at a cost of $163 million. The second phase between Ashley Road and the Charlotte-Douglas International Airport was scheduled for completion by 2034 at a cost of $324 million.

In July 2018, CATS began a reevaluation of the West Corridor, which replaces the originally planned streetcar into two possible light rail routes from Belmont and Charlotte Douglas International Airport to Charlotte Center City and continuation along the planned Southeast Corridor to Matthews. The process involves a series of public meetings and various surveys to know where the public stands regarding the West Corridor and how each of the alternative options rank.

In January 2019, CATS reaffirmed that the West Corridor would be a continuation of the Lynx Silver Line, from the planned Gateway Station, in Uptown, to Belmont. It was also confirmed that the route would travel along Wilkinson Boulevard, dropping the alternative routing along Alleghany and Tuckaseegee roads. On February 27, 2019, the MTC unanimously approved to merge the West Corridor into the Lynx Silver Line.

=== Refined locally preferred alternative ===
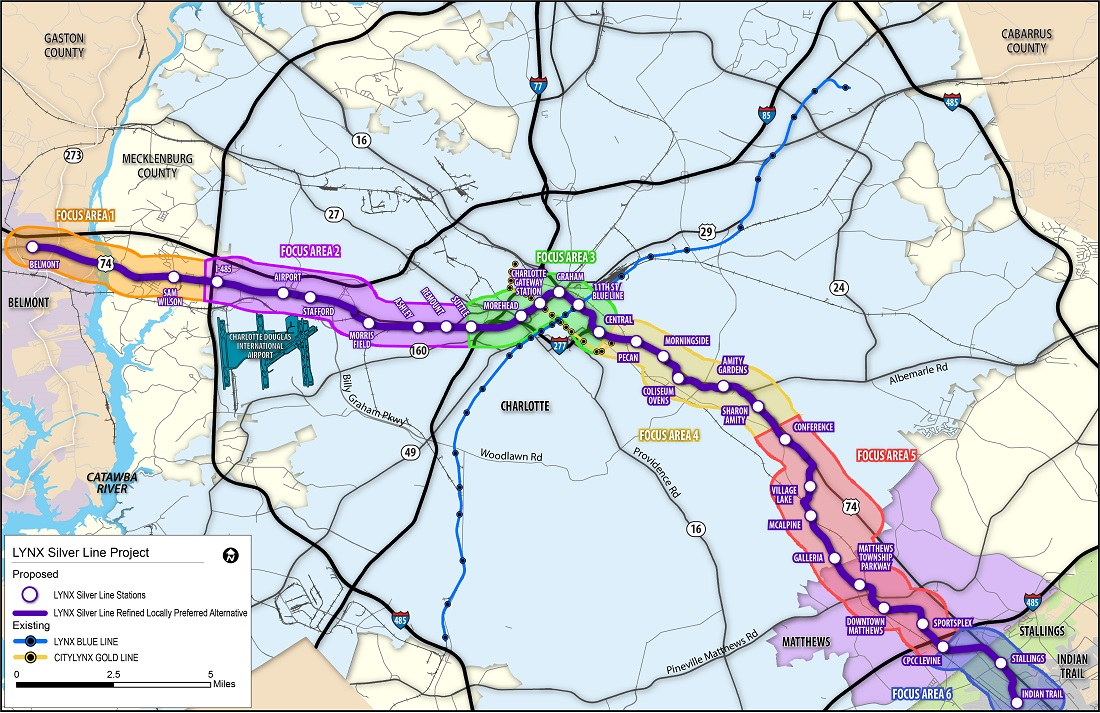
Refined locally preferred alternative

In early 2021, CATS released the refined locally preferred alternative (LPA) for the Silver line, accompanied with a series videos and a website showing what they considered and why they choose the routing and stations identified. The revised roughly 26 miles (42 km) alignment included 29 stations and one maintenance facility along it, from Belmont to its new eastern terminus in Indian Trail. The following is a breakdown of the refinement, broken into six focus areas, all of which is subject to change:

1. In Gaston County, the Belmont station will be situated in front of the Lowe's/Super Walmart, paralleling north along Wilkinson Boulevard, with bridges over Hawley Avenue and Park Street. Crossing the Catawba River, on a separate bridge north of Sloans Ferry Bridge, into Mecklenburg County where it will flyover Wilkinson Boulevard to its south side, at Moores Chapel Loop, and then crosses over Old Dowd Road. Sam Wilson station will be located east of Sam Wilson Road, followed by a second flyover along Wilkinson Boulevard, at Perimeter West Drive, to its north side before crossing I-485.
2. At I-485 station, east of Todd Road, it continues its parallel north of Wilkinson Boulevard to Airport station, where a future people mover will connect passengers to Charlotte Douglas International Airport. Crossing under Little Rock Road, it continues to Stafford station, east of Stafford Drive. Crossing over Billy Graham Parkway, it then does a third flyover of Wilkinson Boulevard, at Mulberry Church Road, where it begins a new parallel alignment next to Norfolk Southern right-of-way, with stations at or near Morris Field Drive, Ashley Road, Remount Road and Suttle Avenue.
3. In Uptown, the alignment continues along the Norfolk Southern right-of-way, with stations at Morehead Street and Charlotte Gateway Station. With a station at Graham Street, it then turns to parallel south of Brookshire Freeway, with a connection at 11th Street/Blue Line before moving over onto north alignment along Independence Expressway/Boulevard with a station at Central Avenue.
4. Continuing along Independence Boulevard, with stations at Pecan Avenue and Morningside Drive, it then crosses along Briar Creek Road to a station at Bojangles Coliseum. Then continuing along a southern parallel of Independence Boulevard, with stations at Amity Gardens and Sharon Amity.
5. Continuing along Independence Boulevard, with a station at Conference Drive, before turning along a future right-of-way alignment of Sharon Forest Drive and crossing over Wallace Drive. With a station at Village Lake, it then crosses over Monroe Road to parallel it on its western side, with a connection at McAlpine. Continuing along Monroe Road, it eventually does a flyover onto its eastern side with stations at Galleria and Matthews Township Parkway. Going under Matthews Township Parkway, it then routes through downtown Matthews, with station, and then following along Matthews-Mint Hill Road to the Sportsplex at Matthews, with station, before crossing I-485 to CPCC Levine, with station.
6. This focus area is a new addition, directed by the MTA, since the 2019. Following CPCC Lane back to a southern parallel alignment with Independence Boulevard, it crosses into Union County. At Stallings Road, there will be a station and park-and-ride. Where Independence Boulevard splits with the Monroe Bypass, it will also diverge west to an eastern parallel of Matthews-Indian Trail Road, where it will end at a station near Indian Trail Town Hall and Chestnut Square Park.

On April 28, 2021, the MTC adopted the locally preferred alternative. One noticeable change from the refined locally preferred alternative was station placement at Boyer Street instead of Stafford Drive; however station area planning and public engagement was still ongoing through the Summer of 2021, with a final Silver Line TOD Plan to be submitted in December 2021. On January 26, 2022, the MTC approved several changes including new stations and alignment adjustments. This includes replacing Suttle Avenue with Berryhill Road, and adding stations at Summit Avenue and First Ward. Also CATS have suggested implementing the line be built in three phases: A) East from Charlotte Gateway Center to CPCC Levine, B) West from Charlotte Gateway Center to I-485, C) Sections that enter another county that require regional funding.

=== Funding Approval ===
In November 2025, Mecklenburg County voters approved a one-cent sales tax increase to fund roads, rail, and transit. The Silver Line was included as a planned project funded by the measure. Work on the line can begin after 50% completion of the new Red Line commuter rail project, per the legislation approving the tax. Due to cost concerns, an initial segment from Airport to Coliseum was proposed. In 2026, the Board heard proposals to value engineer the project or generate additional revenues to fund an initial service distance beyond these two terminals.

The CATS 2027 Fiscal Year budget proposal showed a planned $19m expenditure on Silver Line design and planning.
