= Blue Pullman (disambiguation) =

Blue Pullman was an express passenger service provided by British Rail.

Blue Pullman may also refer to:

- British Rail Classes 251 and 261, a type of diesel-electric multiple unit built by Metro-Cammell in 1960, used to operate the Blue Pullman trains
  - Blue Pullman (film), a 1960 film about the train of the same name
- a railtour operated by Cotswold Rail in 2008
- a railtour operated by FM Rail in 2006
- a railtour operated by Locomotive Services Limited in 2020
