= Blackline =

Blackline or black line may refer to:

- Blackline (GPS company), best known for a car-tracking device that uses Global Positioning (GPS)
- Northern line, a line on the London Underground
- Blackline (software company), whose software offerings are Cloud-based accounting software
- Black Lines, a 2015 album by American rock band Mayday Parade
- Document comparison or blacklining, a computer process to identify changes in a document
- Linea nigra (black line), pigmentation on the abdomen, most often during pregnancy
- Black Line, a cycling team in the British National Team Sprint Championships
- Black Line, an 1830 offensive during the Black War between British colonists and Aboriginal Australians in Tasmania
- Black line, pen and ink line work, a type of line art used to create tonal values in drawing

== See also ==
- Blackline rasbora (Rasbora borapetensis), a fish found in Asia
