= Ranip metro station =

Ahmedabad Metro's Red Line metro station

Ranip
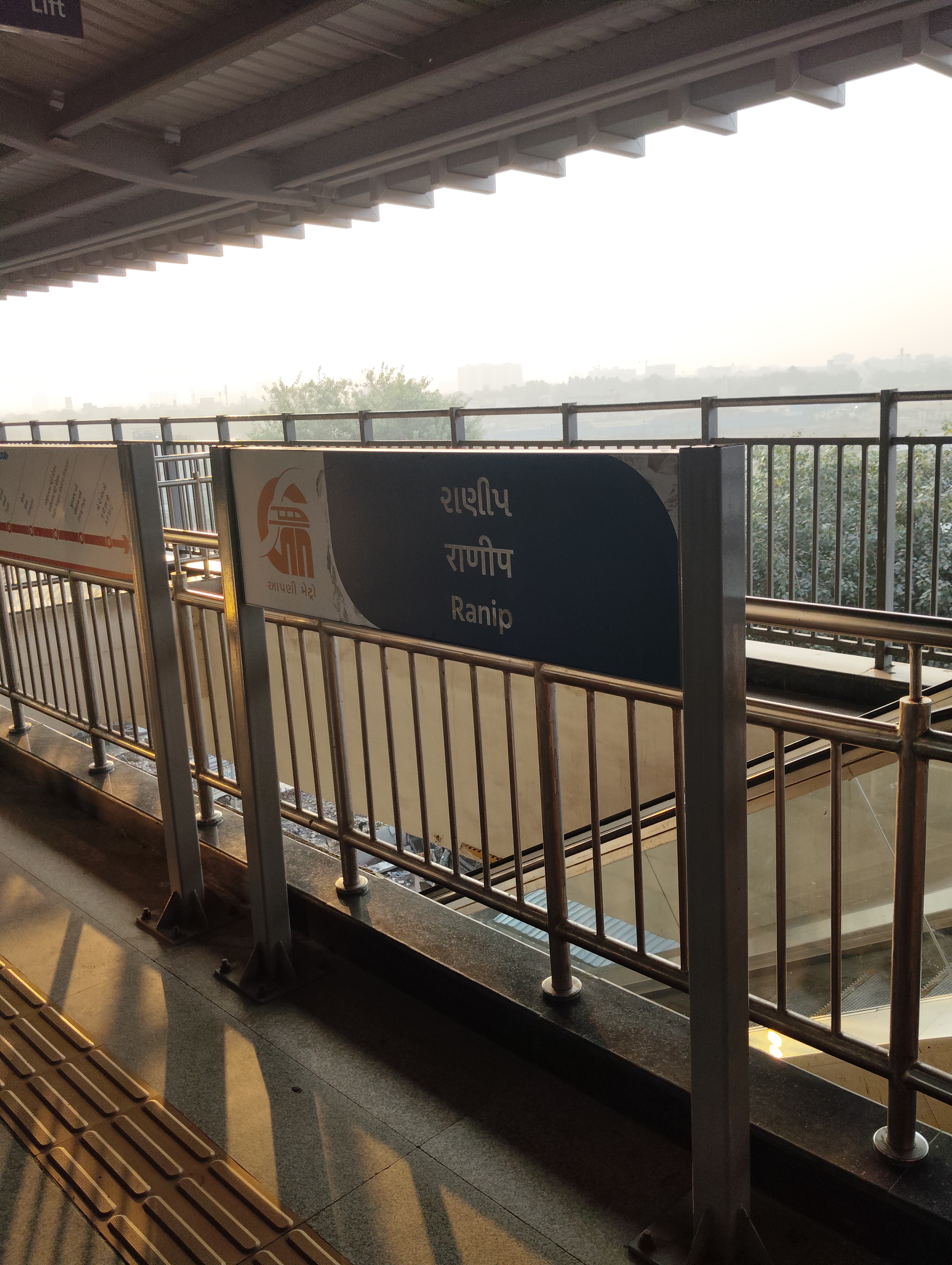
- Board on platform

General information
- Location: Vijay Nagar, Ranip, Ahmedabad, Gujarat 382480
- Coordinates: 23.06774°N 72.57410°E
- System: Ahmedabad Metro station
- Owner: Gujarat Metro Rail Corporation Limited
- Operator: Ahmedabad Metro
- Line: Red Line
- Platforms: Side platform Platform-1 → Sector-1 / GIFT City; Platform-2 → APMC
- Tracks: 2

Construction
- Structure type: Elevated, Double track
- Platform levels: 2
- Accessible: Yes

Other information
- Status: Operational

History
- Opened: 6 October 2022; 3 years ago
- Electrified: 750 V DC third rail

Services
Preceding station	Ahmedabad Metro	Following station
Sabarmati Railway Station towards Sector-1 or GIFT City	Red Line	Vadaj towards APMC
Route map
Location

Ranip is an elevated metro station on the North-South Corridor of the Red Line of Ahmedabad Metro in Ahmedabad, India. Around this metro station holds the main DMart SuperMarket along with Ahmedabad Municipal Swimming Complex and Ahmedabad BRTS Workshop and Depot. This phase of the metro system was inaugurated on 30 September 2022 by Prime Minister Narendra Modi and was opened to the public on 6 October 2022.

== Station layout ==
G
Street level
Exit/Entrance
L1
Mezzanine
Fare control, station agent, Metro Card vending machines, crossover

L2
Side platform | Doors will open on the left
Platform 2
Southbound
Towards → APMC
Next Station: Vadaj
Platform 1
Northbound
Towards ← Sector-1

Next Station: Sabarmati Railway Station

Side platform | Doors will open on the left
L2

== Gallery ==
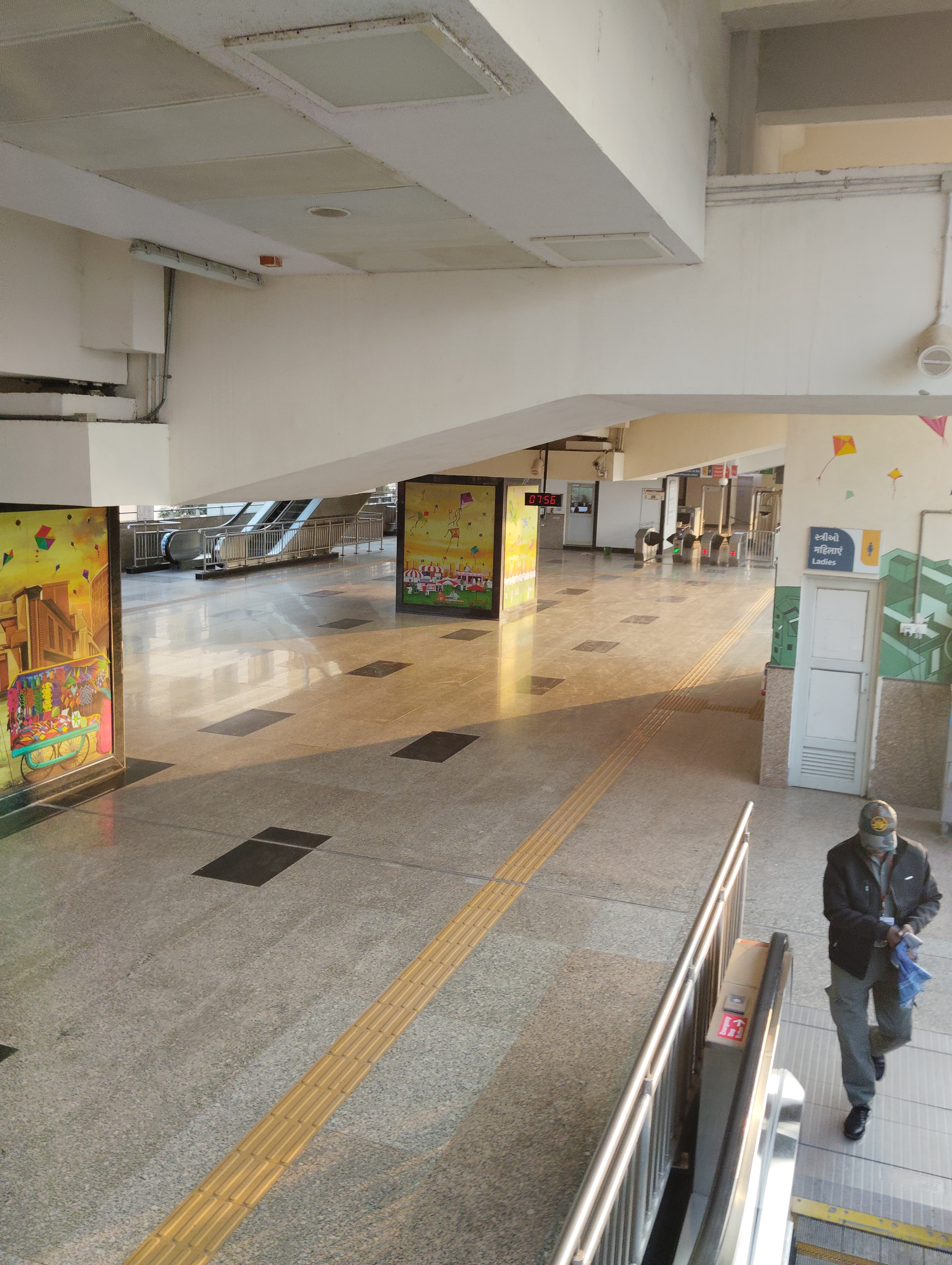
Mezzanine

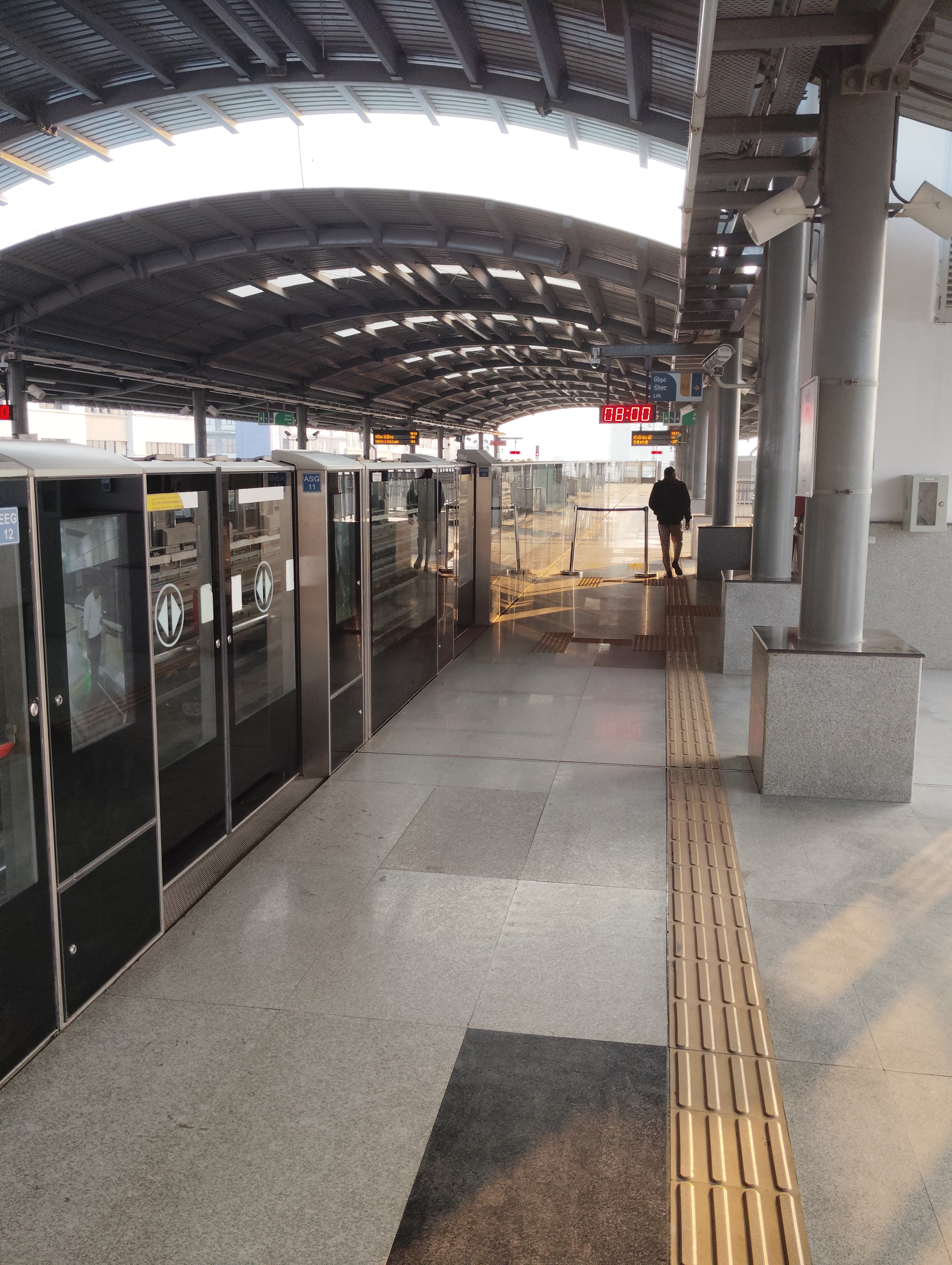
Platform 2

== See also ==
- Ahmedabad
- Gujarat
- List of Ahmedabad Metro stations
- Rapid transit in India
