= Motera Stadium =

Motera Stadium can refer to the following places in Motera, Ahmedabad:

- Motera Stadium metro station
- Narendra Modi Stadium
- Sardar Patel Gujarat Stadium
