= Gandhigram metro station =

Ahmedabad Metro's Red Line metro station

Gandhigram

General information
- Location: Ellis Bridge, Ahmedabad, Gujarat 380009
- Coordinates: 23.02667°N 72.56890°E
- System: Ahmedabad Metro station
- Owner: Gujarat Metro Rail Corporation Limited
- Operator: Ahmedabad Metro
- Line: Red Line
- Platforms: Side platform Platform-1 → Mahatman Mandir / GIFT City; Platform-2 → APMC
- Tracks: 2
- Connections: Gandhigram

Construction
- Structure type: Elevated, Double track
- Platform levels: 2
- Accessible: Yes

Other information
- Status: Operational

History
- Opened: 6 October 2022; 3 years ago
- Electrified: 750 V DC third rail

Services
Preceding station	Ahmedabad Metro	Following station
Paldi towards APMC	Red Line	Old High Court towards Mahatma Mandir or GIFT City
Route map
Location

Gandhigram is an elevated metro station on the North-South Corridor of the Red Line of Ahmedabad Metro in Ahmedabad, India. Around this metro station holds the main Gandhigram railway station along with Ahmedabad Medical Association (AMI) and Reserve Bank of India Main Office (Ahmedabad). This phase of the metro system was inaugurated on 30 September 2022 by Prime Minister Narendra Modi and was opened to the public on 6 October 2022.

== Station layout ==
G	Street level	Exit/Entrance
L1	Mezzanine	Fare control, station agent, Metro Card vending machines, crossover
L2	Side platform | Doors will open on the left
L2	Platform 2 Southbound	Towards → APMC; Next Station: Paldi
L2	Platform 1 Northbound	Towards ← Mahatma Mandir / GIFT City; Next Station: Old High Court Change at the next station for Blue Line
L2	Side platform | Doors will open on the left
L2

== See also ==
- Ahmedabad
- Gujarat
- List of Ahmedabad Metro stations
- Rapid transit in India
