= Shreyas metro station =

Ahmedabad Metro's Red Line metro station

Shreyas

General information
- Location: Sukhipura, Ambawadi, Ahmedabad, Gujarat 380007
- Coordinates: 23.01364°N 72.54944°E
- System: Ahmedabad Metro
- Operator: Gujarat Metro Rail Corporation Limited
- Line: Red Line
- Platforms: 2 (2 island platforms)

Construction
- Structure type: Elevated
- Accessible: Yes

Other information
- Status: Operational

History
- Opened: 6 October 2022; 3 years ago

Services
Preceding station	Ahmedabad Metro	Following station
Rajiv Nagar towards APMC	Red Line	Paldi towards Mahatma Mandir or GIFT City
Route map
Location

Shreyas is an elevated metro station on the North-South Corridor of the Red Line of Ahmedabad Metro in Ahmedabad, India. Around this metro station holds the main CN Sports Academy along with Sukhipura Garden Park and residential apartments. This metro station was inaugurated on 30 September 2022 by Prime Minister Narendra Modi and was opened to the public on 6 October 2022.

== Station layout ==
G
Street level
Exit/Entrance
L1
Mezzanine
Fare control, station agent, Metro Card vending machines, crossover

L2
Side platform | Doors will open on the left
Platform 2
Southbound
Towards → APMC
Next Station: Rajiv Nagar
Platform 1
Northbound
Towards ← Mahatma Mandir / GIFT City

Next Station: Paldi

Side platform | Doors will open on the left
L2

== See also ==
- Ahmedabad
- Gujarat
- List of Ahmedabad Metro stations
- Rapid transit in India
