= Yellow Line (Ahmedabad Metro) =

Railway line in Ahmedabad, India

Overview
- Status: Operational
- Locale: Gandhinagar
- Termini: Motera Stadium; Mahatma Mandir
- Stations: 21

Service
- Type: Rapid transit
- System: Ahmedabad Metro
- Operator: Gujarat Metro Rail Corporation Limited
- Rolling stock: Hyundai Rotem

History
- Opened: 16 September 2024; 2 years ago (Sector-1 to GNLU and Motera Stadium)

Technical
- Line length: 23.84 km (14.81 mi)
- Character: Elevated
- Track gauge: 1,435 mm (4 ft 8 1/2 in) (Standard gauge)
- Electrification: 750V DC Third Rail
Route map
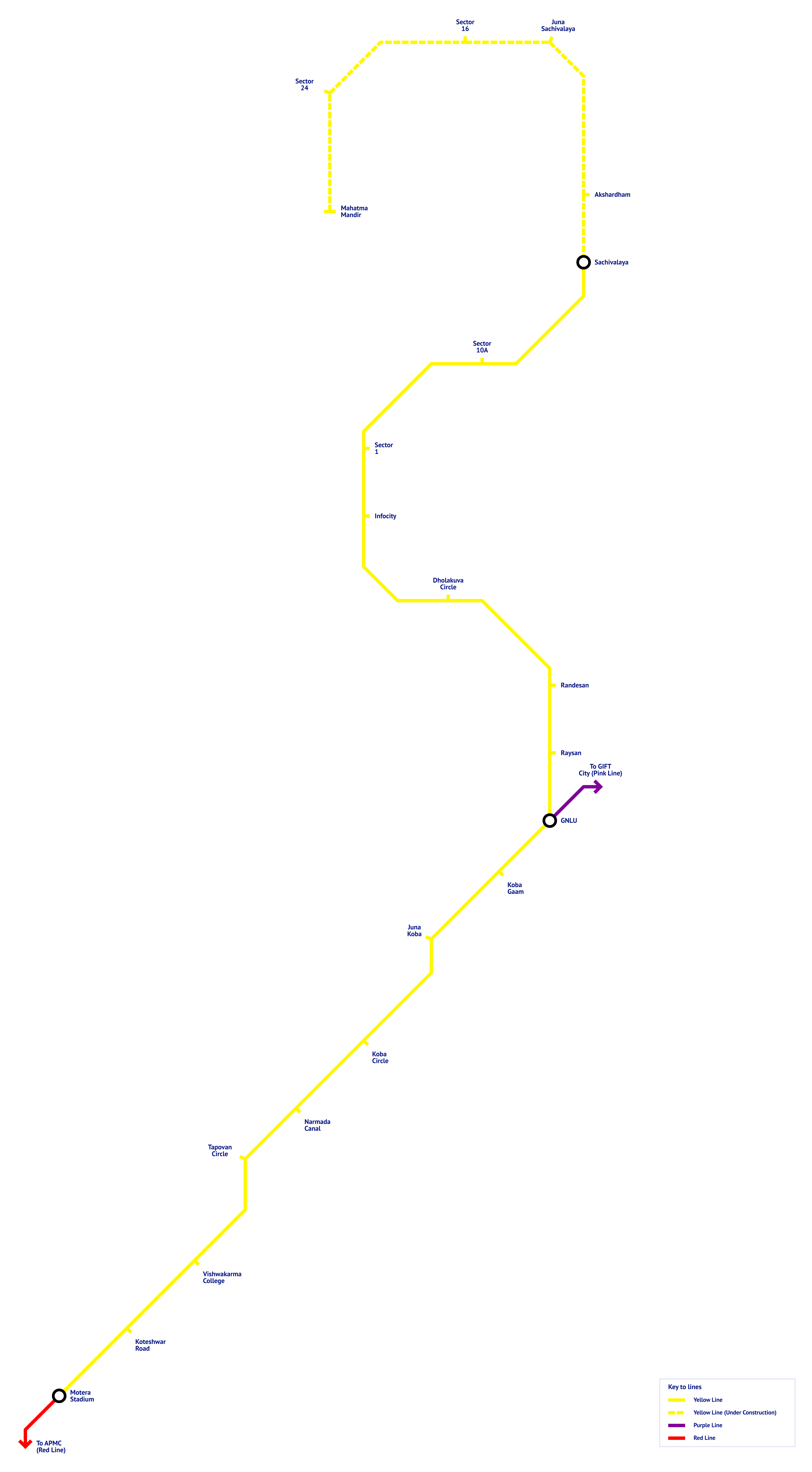

The Yellow Line of the Ahmedabad Metro is a metro route of the mass rapid transit system in Ahmedabad, India. The construction was started in January 2021 and was completed in January 2026.

== History ==
The Government of Gujarat approved the Phase-2 of Ahmedabad Metro in October 2017 and revised it in October 2018. In February 2019, the Union cabinet approved the Phase-2 worth cost of ₹5,384.17 crore (US$560 million). It will extend the north–south corridor from Motera in Ahmedabad to Mahatma Mandir in Gandhinagar (23.838 km (14.812 mi)) with a branch line from Gujarat National Law University (GNLU) linking Pandit Deendayal Energy University (PDEU) and GIFT City (5.416 km). The Phase-2 will have total 28.26 km (17.56 mi)-long elevated corridor with 22 stations.

The tendering for the Phase 2 began in January 2020. On 18 January 2021, the foundation stone of the Phase-2 was laid by Prime Minister Modi.

In February 2023, Titagarh Rail Systems won a contract worth ₹350 crore (US$36 million) for providing rolling stock for the Phase-2.

The trial run of Phase-2 started in February 2024 between GNLU and Dholakuva Circle stations. The Yellow Line connecting Sector 1 station of Gandhinagar with the Red Line's Motera Stadium along with six new stations on Yellow Line were inaugurated on 16 September 2024 by Prime Minister Narendra Modi and was open to the public on 17 September 2024. Seven new stations on Yellow Line were opened to public on 27 April 2025. Juna Koba and Koba Gaam stations were opened on 28 September 2025. The final 5.36-kilometre corridor of the Yellow Line, from Sachivalaya (Secretariat) to Mahatma Mandir, was inaugurated on 11 January 2026 by Prime Minister Modi.

== List of stations ==
Following is a list of stations on this route:

Yellow Line
#	Station Name		Opening	Connections	Layout
#	English	Gujarati	Opening	Connections	Layout
1	Mahatma Mandir	મહાત્મા મંદિર	11 January 2026	Gandhinagar Capital	Elevated
2	Sector-24	સેક્ટર-24	11 January 2026	City Bus Stop	Elevated
3	Sector-16	સેક્ટર-16	11 January 2026	City Bus Stop	Elevated
4	Juna Sachivalaya	જૂના સચિવાલય	11 January 2026	City Bus Stop	Elevated
5	Akshardham	અક્ષરધામ	11 January 2026	None	Elevated
6	Sachivalaya	સચિવાલય	27 April 2025	City Bus Stop	Elevated
7	Sector-10A	સેક્ટર-10એ	27 April 2025	City Bus Stop	Elevated
8	Sector-1	સેક્ટર-1	16 September 2024	City Bus Stop	Elevated
9	Infocity	ઇન્ફોસિટી	16 September 2024	City Bus Stop	Elevated
10	Dholakuva Circle	ધોળાકુવા સર્કલ	16 September 2024	None	Elevated
11	Randesan	રાંદેસણ	16 September 2024	None	Elevated
12	Raysan	રાયસન	16 September 2024	None	Elevated
13	GNLU	જી એન એલ યુ	16 September 2024	Violet Line	Elevated
14	Koba Gaam	કોબા ગામ	28 September 2025	None	Elevated
15	Juna Koba	જૂના કોબા	28 September 2025	None	Elevated
16	Koba Circle	કોબા સર્કલ	27 April 2025	None	Elevated
17	Narmada Canal	નર્મદા કેનાલ	27 April 2025	None	Elevated
18	Tapovan Circle	તપોવન સર્કલ	27 April 2025	None	Elevated
19	Vishwakarma College	વિશ્વકર્મા કોલેજ	27 April 2025	None	Elevated
20	Koteshwar Road	કોટેશ્વર રોડ	27 April 2025	None	Elevated
21	Motera Stadium	મોટેરા સ્ટેડિયમ	30 September 2022	Red Line	Elevated

== Map ==
Click on icons for more details
