= AEC metro station =

Ahmedabad Metro's Red Line metro station

AEC

General information
- Location: Dharm Nagar II, Sabarmati, Ahmedabad, Gujarat 380005
- Coordinates: 23.07511°N 72.59321°E
- System: Ahmedabad Metro station
- Owner: Gujarat Metro Rail Corporation Limited
- Operator: Ahmedabad Metro
- Line: Red Line
- Platforms: Side platform Platform-1 → Sector-1 / GIFT City; Platform-2 → APMC
- Tracks: 2
- Connections: Sabarmati HSR (under-construction)

Construction
- Structure type: Elevated, Double track
- Platform levels: 2
- Accessible: Yes

Other information
- Status: Operational

History
- Opened: 6 October 2022; 3 years ago
- Electrified: 750 V DC third rail

Services
Preceding station	Ahmedabad Metro	Following station
Sabarmati towards Sector-1 or GIFT City	Red Line	Sabarmati Railway Station towards APMC
Route map
Location

AEC is an elevated metro station on the North-South Corridor of the Red Line of Ahmedabad Metro in Ahmedabad, India. Around this metro station holds the main and upcoming Sabarmati HSR Terminal railway station along with AEC Garden Park and Torrent Power Limited.

This phase of the metro system was inaugurated on 30 September 2022 by Prime Minister Narendra Modi and was opened to the public on 6 October 2022.

== Station layout ==
G
Street level
Exit/Entrance
L1
Mezzanine
Fare control, station agent, Metro Card vending machines, crossover

L2
Side platform | Doors will open on the left
Platform 2
Southbound
Towards → APMC
Next Station: Sabarmati Railway Station
Platform 1
Northbound
Towards ← Sector-1

Next Station: Sabarmati

Side platform | Doors will open on the left
L2

== See also ==
- Ahmedabad
- Gujarat
- List of Ahmedabad Metro stations
- Rapid transit in India
