= Red Line (Ahmedabad Metro) =

Railway line in Ahmedabad, India

Overview
- Status: Operational
- Locale: Ahmedabad; Gandhinagar
- Termini: Motera Stadium; APMC
- Stations: 15 (14 Operational)

Service
- Type: Rapid Transit
- System: Ahmedabad Metro
- Operator(s): Gujarat Metro Rail Corporation Limited
- Rolling stock: Hyundai Rotem

History
- Opened: 6 October 2022; 3 years ago

Technical
- Line length: 18.87 km (11.73 mi)
- Character: Elevated
- Track gauge: 1,435 mm (4 ft 8 1/2 in) (Standard gauge)
- Electrification: 750V DC Third Rail

The Red Line of the Ahmedabad Metro is a metro route of the mass rapid transit system in Ahmedabad, India.

== History ==
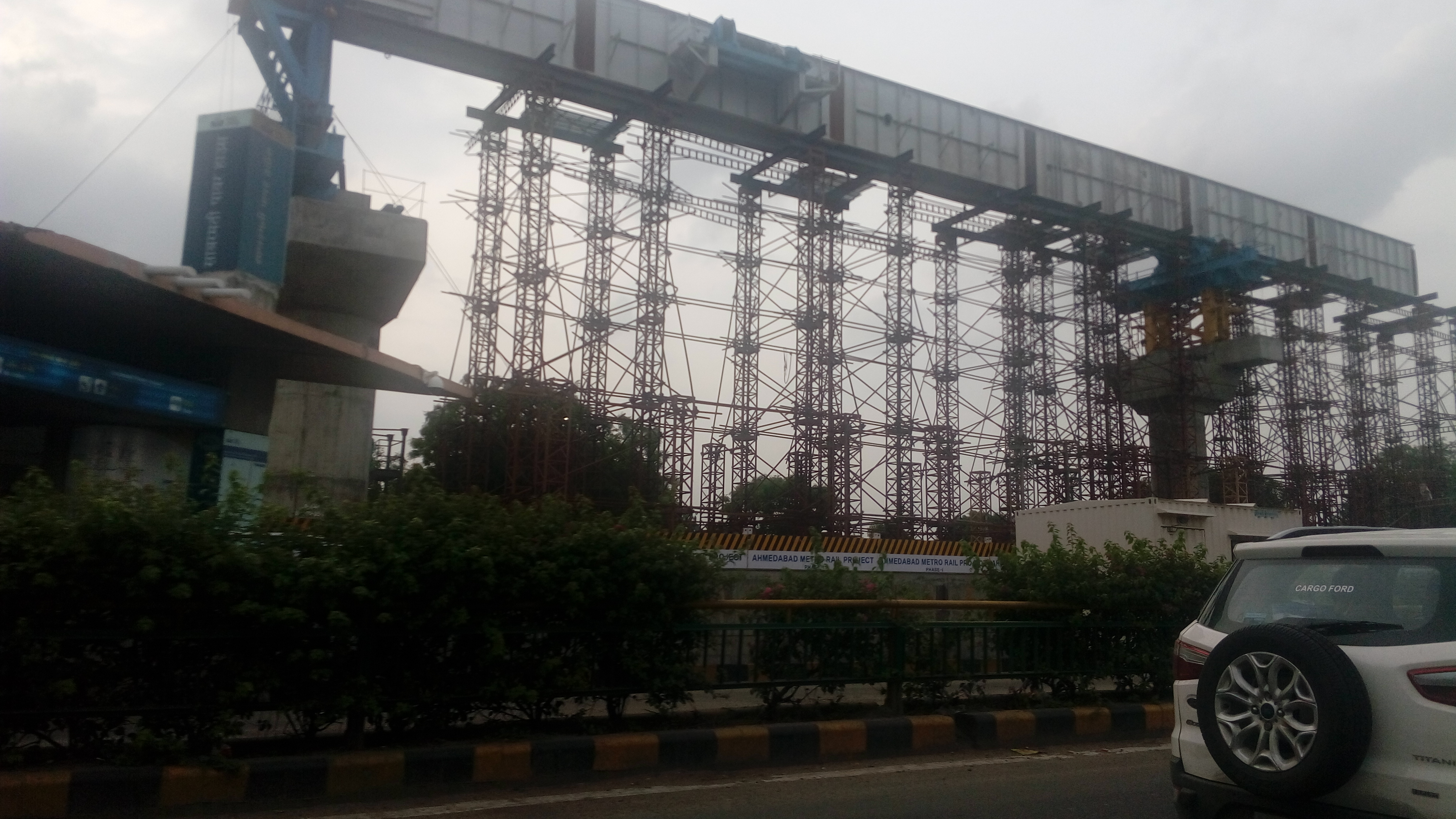
North-South Corridor under construction near Sabarmati Powerhouse and Sabarmati Railway Station 9 July 2017

The Phase-1 (North-South Corridor) of Ahmedabad Metro consists of 15 metro stations from APMC to Motera Stadium with a total distance of 18.87 km (11.73 mi). The line is completely elevated. It connects Motera Stadium to APMC, Vasna and will be passing through Sabarmati, AEC, Sabarmati Railway station, Ranip, Vadaj, Vijaynagar, Usmanpura, Old High court, Gandhigram, Paldi, Shreyas, Rajivnagar and Jivraj stations. The Phase-1 of the North-South Corridor was inaugurated on 30 September 2022 by Indian Prime Minister Narendra Modi. It was opened to public on 6 October 2022 except Sabarmati Railway Station metro station which is under construction.

== List of stations ==
Following is a list of stations on this route:

Red Line
#	Station Name		Opening	Connections	Layout
#	English	Gujarati	Opening	Connections	Layout
1	Motera Stadium	મોટેરા સ્ટેડિયમ	30 September 2022	Yellow Line	Elevated
2	Sabarmati	સાબરમતી	30 September 2022	Ahmedabad BRTS	Elevated
3	AEC	એ ઇ સી	30 September 2022	Ahmedabad BRTS Sabarmati HSR (under-construction)	Elevated
4	Sabarmati Railway Station	સાબરમતી રેલવે સ્ટેશન	Under construction	Sabarmati Junction	Elevated
5	Ranip	રાણીપ	30 September 2022	Ahmedabad BRTS; GSRTC Bus Station	Elevated
6	Vadaj	વાડજ	30 September 2022	Ahmedabad BRTS	Elevated
7	Vijay Nagar	વિજય નગર	30 September 2022	None	Elevated
8	Usmanpura	ઉસ્માનપુરા	30 September 2022	None	Elevated
9	Old High Court	જૂની હાઇ કોર્ટ	30 September 2022	Blue Line	Elevated
10	Gandhigram	ગાંધીગ્રામ	30 September 2022	Gandhigram	Elevated
11	Paldi	પાલડી	30 September 2022	None	Elevated
12	Shreyas	શ્રેયસ	30 September 2022	None	Elevated
13	Rajiv Nagar	રાજીવ નગર	30 September 2022	None	Elevated
14	Jivraj Park	જીવરાજ પાર્ક	30 September 2022	None	Elevated
15	APMC	એ પી એમ સી	30 September 2022	GSRTC Bus Station	Elevated

== Map ==
Click on icons for more details
