= Jivraj Park metro station =

Ahmedabad Metro's Red Line metro station

Jivraj Park

General information
- Location: Jivraj Park, Ahmedabad, Gujarat 380051
- Coordinates: 23.00551°N 72.53357°E
- System: Ahmedabad Metro station
- Owner: Gujarat Metro Rail Corporation Limited
- Operator: Ahmedabad Metro
- Line: Red Line
- Platforms: Side platform Platform-1 → Mahatma Mandir / GIFT City; Platform-2 → APMC
- Tracks: 2

Construction
- Structure type: Elevated, Double track
- Platform levels: 2
- Accessible: Yes

Other information
- Status: Operational

History
- Opened: 6 October 2022; 3 years ago
- Electrified: 750 V DC third rail

Services
Preceding station	Ahmedabad Metro	Following station
APMC Terminus	Red Line	Rajiv Nagar towards Mahatma Mandir or GIFT City
Route map
Location

Jivraj Park is an elevated metro station on the North-South Corridor of the Red Line of Ahmedabad Metro in Ahmedabad, India. Around this metro station holds the main DMart Supermarket along with Auda Garden Park, Rish Orthopedic Hospital in southern Ahmedabad. This metro station was inaugurated on 30 September 2022 by Prime Minister Narendra Modi and was opened to the public on 6 October 2022.

== Station layout ==
G
Street level
Exit/Entrance
L1
Mezzanine
Fare control, station agent, Metro Card vending machines, crossover

L2
Side platform | Doors will open on the left
Platform 2
Southbound
Towards → APMC
Platform 1
Northbound
Towards ← Mahatma Mandir/GIFT City

Next Station: Rajiv Nagar

Side platform | Doors will open on the left
L2

== See also ==
- Ahmedabad
- Gujarat
- List of Ahmedabad Metro stations
- Rapid transit in India
