= Gandhigram railway station =

Western Railway station at Ahmedabad, India

Gandhigram

General information
- Location: Near Townhall, Ellis Bridge, Ahmedabad, Gujarat; India
- Coordinates: 23°04′17″N 72°35′14″E
- Elevation: 55 metres (180 ft)
- System: Indian Railways station
- Owner: Indian Railways
- Operator: Western Railways
- Line: Ahmedabad–Botad line
- Platforms: 2
- Tracks: 3
- Connections: Red Line Gandhigram; AMTS, Ahmedabad BRTS

Construction
- Structure type: Standard (on-ground station)
- Parking: Yes
- Accessible: Accessible

Other information
- Status: Functioning
- Station code: GG
- Zone(s): Western Railway
- Division(s): Bhavnagar

History
- Opened: 18 June 2022 (After Gauge conversion)
Location

Gandhigram railway station is a railway station in Ahmedabad, Gujarat, India. It lies on the Ahmedabad – Botad line that is recently converted to broad gauge from meter gauge. It comes under the Bhavnagar railway division of Western Railway yet it is Suburban station of Ahmedabad. Prior to its closure, it was a terminal for all Ahmedabad-bound metre-gauge trains.

Now it has reopened on 18 June 2022 by our P.M. Modi as gauge conversion and metro work has come to end. It contains 3 tracks and 2 platforms.

It has an interchange with the North–South line, but the source of the name is unknown of the Ahmedabad Metro.

== Trains ==
- 20965/66 Sabarmati (Ahmedabad) – Bhavnagar Intercity SF Express
- 09573/74 Gandhigram (Ahmedabad) – Botad Passenger
- 09577/78 Ganghigram (Ahmedabad) – Botad Passenger
- 09577/78 Gandhigram (Ahmedabad) – Okha Weekly Special
- 09215/16 Gandhigram (Ahmedabad) – Bhavnagar Express Special
- 09211/12 Gandhigram (Ahmedabad) – Botad Express Special
