= Sabarmati metro station =

Ahmedabad Metro's Red Line metro station

Sabarmati

General information
- Location: Ramnagar, Acher, Ahmedabad, Gujarat 380005
- Coordinates: 23.08564°N 72.59228°E
- System: Ahmedabad Metro station
- Operator: Gujarat Metro Rail Corporation Limited
- Line: Red Line
- Platforms: 2 (2 side platforms)

Construction
- Structure type: Elevated
- Accessible: Yes

Other information
- Status: Operational

History
- Opened: 6 October 2022; 3 years ago

Services
Preceding station	Ahmedabad Metro	Following station
AEC towards APMC	Red Line	Motera Stadium towards Mahatma Mandir or GIFT City
Route map
Location

Sabarmati is an elevated metro station on the North-South Corridor of the Red Line of Ahmedabad Metro in Ahmedabad, India. Around this metro station holds the Sabarmati Police station along with Panchshil Hospital, Manav Mitra Convention Centre and Pukhraj Raichand General Hospital in Ahmedabad. This metro station was inaugurated on 30 September 2022 by Prime Minister Narendra Modi and was opened to the public on 6 October 2022.

== Station layout ==
G	Street level	Exit/Entrance
L1	Mezzanine	Fare control, station agent, Metro Card vending machines, crossover
L2	Side platform | Doors will open on the left
L2	Platform 2 Southbound	Towards → APMC; Next Station: AEC
L2	Platform 1 Northbound	Towards ← Sector-1; Next Station: Motera Stadium
L2	Side platform | Doors will open on the left
L2

== See also ==
- List of Ahmedabad Metro stations
- Rapid transit in India
