= Motera Stadium metro station =

Ahmedabad Metro's Red Line metro station

Motera Stadium
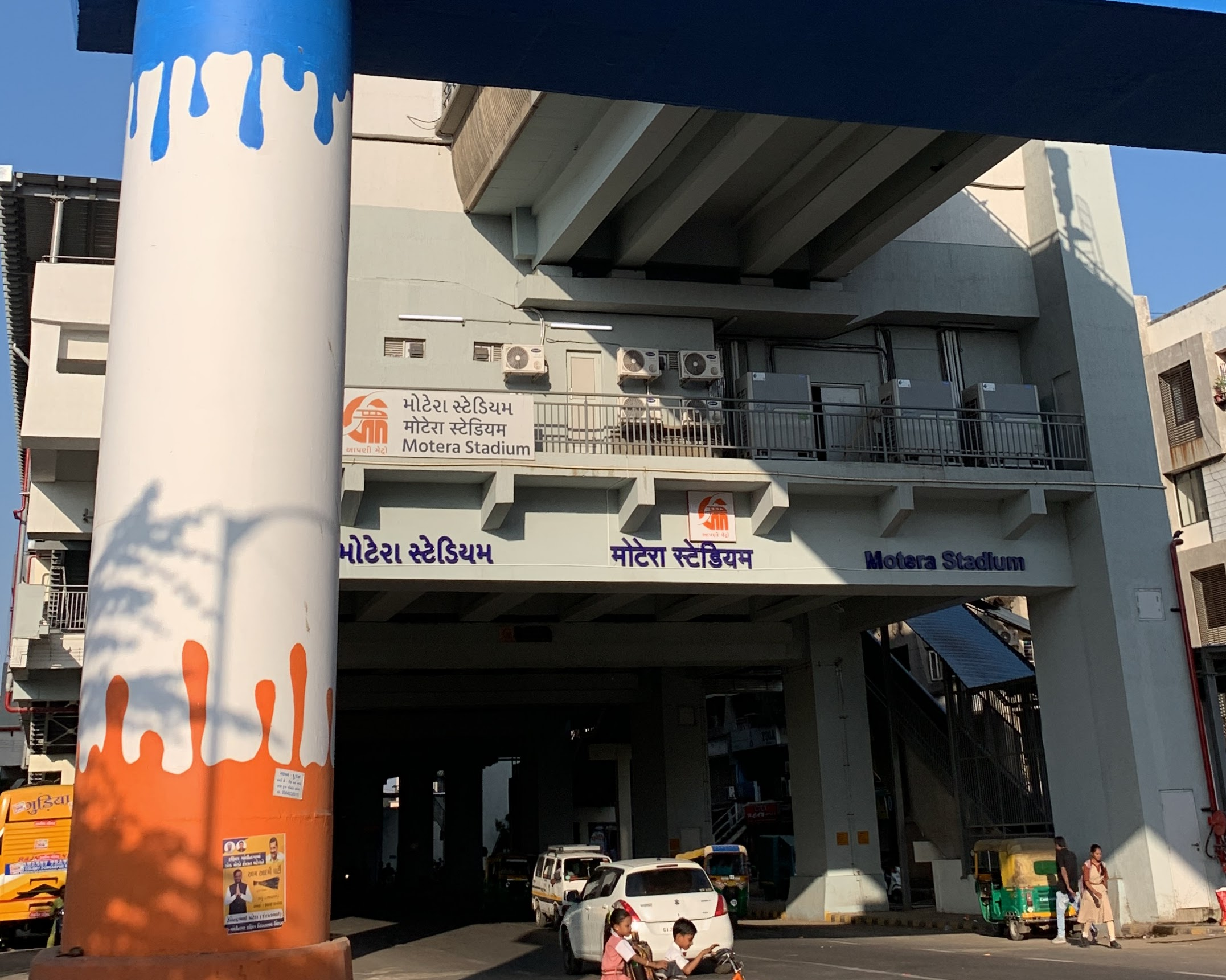
- The mezzanine of the station as seen from the ground level

General information
- Location: Motera, Ahmedabad, Gujarat 380005
- Coordinates: 23°05′48″N 72°36′03″E
- System: Ahmedabad Metro
- Owner: Gujarat Metro Rail Corporation Limited
- Operator: Ahmedabad Metro
- Line: Red Line
- Platforms: 2 (2 side platforms)
- Tracks: 2

Construction
- Structure type: Elevated, Double track
- Accessible: Yes

Other information
- Status: Operational

History
- Opening: 6 October 2022; 3 years ago

Services
Preceding station	Ahmedabad Metro	Following station
Sabarmati towards APMC	Red Line	Koteshwar Road towards Mahatma Mandir or GIFT City
Track layout
Location

Motera Stadium is an elevated metro station on the North-South Corridor of the Red Line of Ahmedabad Metro in Ahmedabad, India, which holds the main Narendra Modi Stadium, the world's largest Cricket stadium in India. This metro station was inaugurated on 30 September 2022 by Prime Minister Narendra Modi and was opened to the public on 6 October 2022.

== Station layout ==
2nd floor	Side platform
2nd floor	Platform 1 Northbound	toward Mahatma Mandir / GIFT City (Koteshwar Road) →
2nd floor	Platform 2 Southbound	← toward APMC (Sabarmati)
2nd floor	Side platform
1st floor	Mezzanine	Fare control, station agent, Metro Card vending machines, crossover
Ground	Street level	Exit/Entrance

== See also ==
- Ahmedabad
- Gujarat
- List of Ahmedabad Metro stations
- Rapid transit in India
