= APMC metro station =

Ahmedabad Metro's Red Line terminal metro station

APMC

General information
- Location: Gupta Nagar, Vasna, Ahmedabad, Gujarat 380007
- Coordinates: 22.99773°N 72.53725°E
- System: Ahmedabad Metro station
- Owner: Gujarat Metro Rail Corporation Limited
- Operator: Ahmedabad Metro
- Line: Red Line
- Platforms: Side platform Platform-1 → Manatma Mandir / GIFT City; Platform-2 → Train Terminates Here
- Tracks: 2

Construction
- Structure type: Elevated, Double track
- Platform levels: 2
- Accessible: Yes

Other information
- Status: Operational

History
- Opened: 6 October 2022; 3 years ago
- Electrified: 750 V DC third rail

Services
Preceding station	Ahmedabad Metro	Following station
Terminus	Red Line	Jivraj Park towards Mahatma Mandir or GIFT City
Route map
Location

APMC is the elevated southern terminal metro station on the North-South Corridor of the Red Line of Ahmedabad Metro in Ahmedabad, India. Around this metro station holds the main Shri Chimanbhai Jivabhai Patel Market which is famous for local groceries in southern Ahmedabad. To the south leads towards the Gyaspur Metro Train Depot which will hold all Red Line metro trains for maintenance purposes. This metro station was inaugurated on 30 September 2022 by Prime Minister Narendra Modi and was opened to the public on 6 October 2022.

== Station layout ==
G
Street level
Exit/Entrance
L1
Mezzanine
Fare control, station agent, Metro Card vending machines, crossover

L2
Side platform | Doors will open on the left
Platform 2
Southbound
Towards → Train Terminates Here
Platform 1
Northbound
Towards ← Mahatma Mandir/GIFT City

Next Station: Jivraj Park

Side platform | Doors will open on the left
L2

== See also ==
- List of Ahmedabad Metro stations
- Rapid transit in India
