= Walter B. Hook =

American urban planner

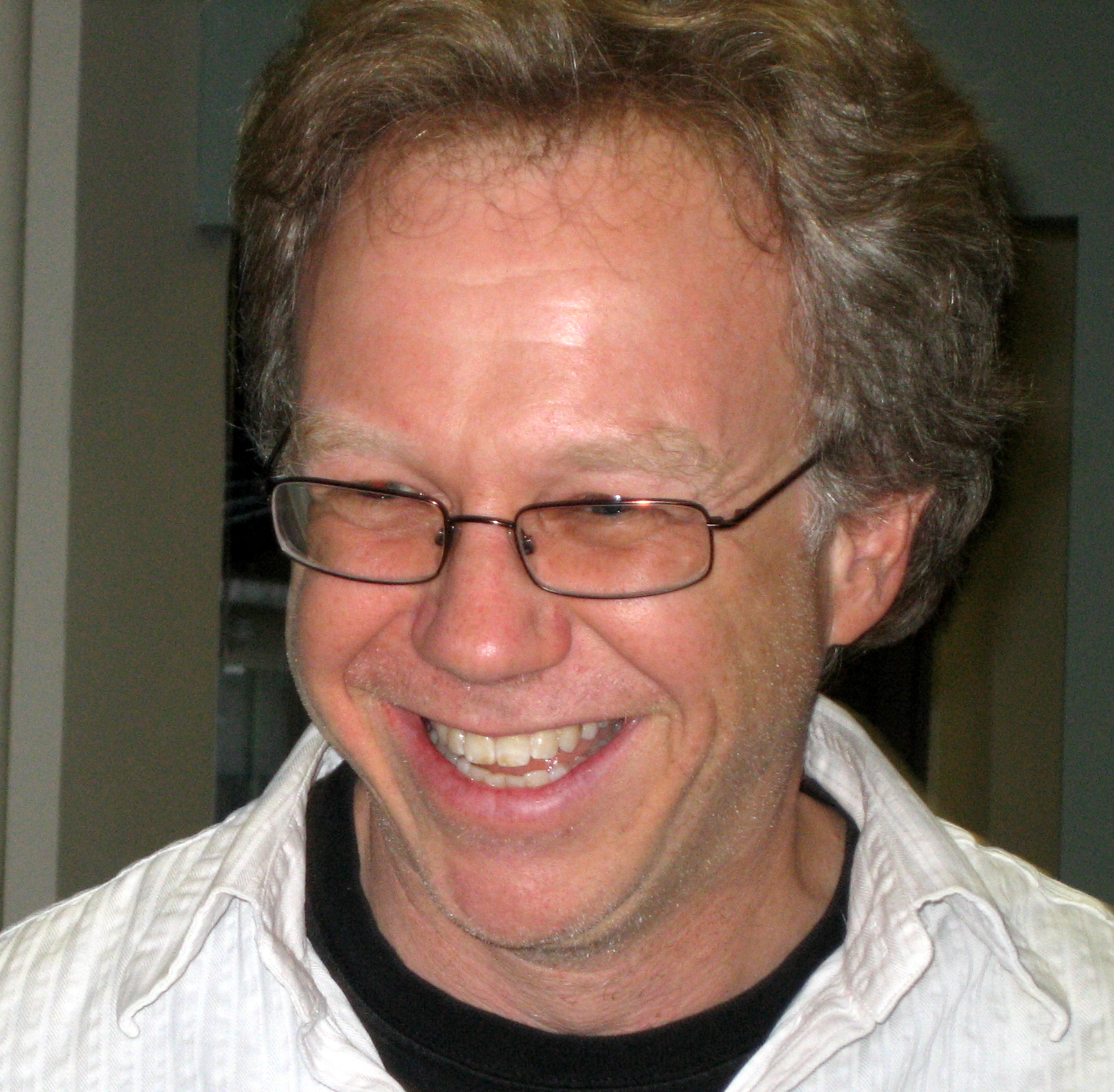
- Born: August 17, 1961; Tacoma Park, Maryland
- Education: Johns Hopkins University (B.A.); School of International and Public Affairs, Columbia University (Master of Intl. Affairs); School of Urban Planning, Columbia University (Ph.D.)
- Occupations: Principal, BRT Planning International, LLC
- Employer(s): BRT Planning International, LLC
- Website: https://www.brtplan.com

Walter B. Hook is an urban planner and expert in the field of sustainable transportation policy and practice. Since 2015, Dr. Hook has been a Principal at BRT Planning International, LLC, a boutique BRT planning firm. From 1993 until 2014, Hook worked as the Chief Executive Officer for the Institute for Transportation and Development Policy (ITDP), a nonprofit agency that promotes environmentally sustainable and equitable transportation policies and projects in the developing world. Under the auspices of ITDP, Hook worked on the design and implementation of numerous bus rapid transit (BRT) systems in Asia, Africa, and Latin America, and is considered a leading expert on BRT design and policy. He collaborated extensively with Enrique Peñalosa, former mayor of Bogotá, Colombia, and creator of the TransMilenio, one of the world's premier BRT systems. Additionally, Hook has campaigned for sustainable transport and urban planning practices in the U.S.

Hook received his PhD in Urban Planning from Columbia University in 1996 and taught as an adjunct professor at Columbia University’s School of Architecture and Urban Planning from 1994 until 1996, and again in 1999. He holds a Master's in International Affairs from Columbia University’s School of International and Public Affairs, and a BA from the Johns Hopkins University.

== Technical Assistance ==
In his work as CEO for ITDP, Hook managed programs and projects providing technical assistance to local governments and NGOs in developing countries and on BRT systems, non-motorized transport, traffic demand management, and sustainable land use.

Hook has worked directly in the design of BRT systems including Jakarta, Indonesia's TransJakarta; Johannesburg, South Africa's Rea Vaya; Ahmedabad, India's Janmarg; and Mexico City's Metrobus, and as a technical advisor for existing BRT systems.

In June 2007, ITDP published the BRT Planning Guide, co-written by Hook along with Lloyd Wright of Viva Cities. The guide draws from the extensive BRT design experience of Latin American transit planners, and aims to disseminate this information in the U.S. and other countries around the world. The guide is currently available in English, Portuguese and Chinese, and is available for download in .pdf format from ITDP's website free of charge. Currently Dr. Hook is in the process of completing edits to the new edition of the BRT Planning Guide that will be released in late 2015 and 2016 in several volumes.

== Advocacy ==
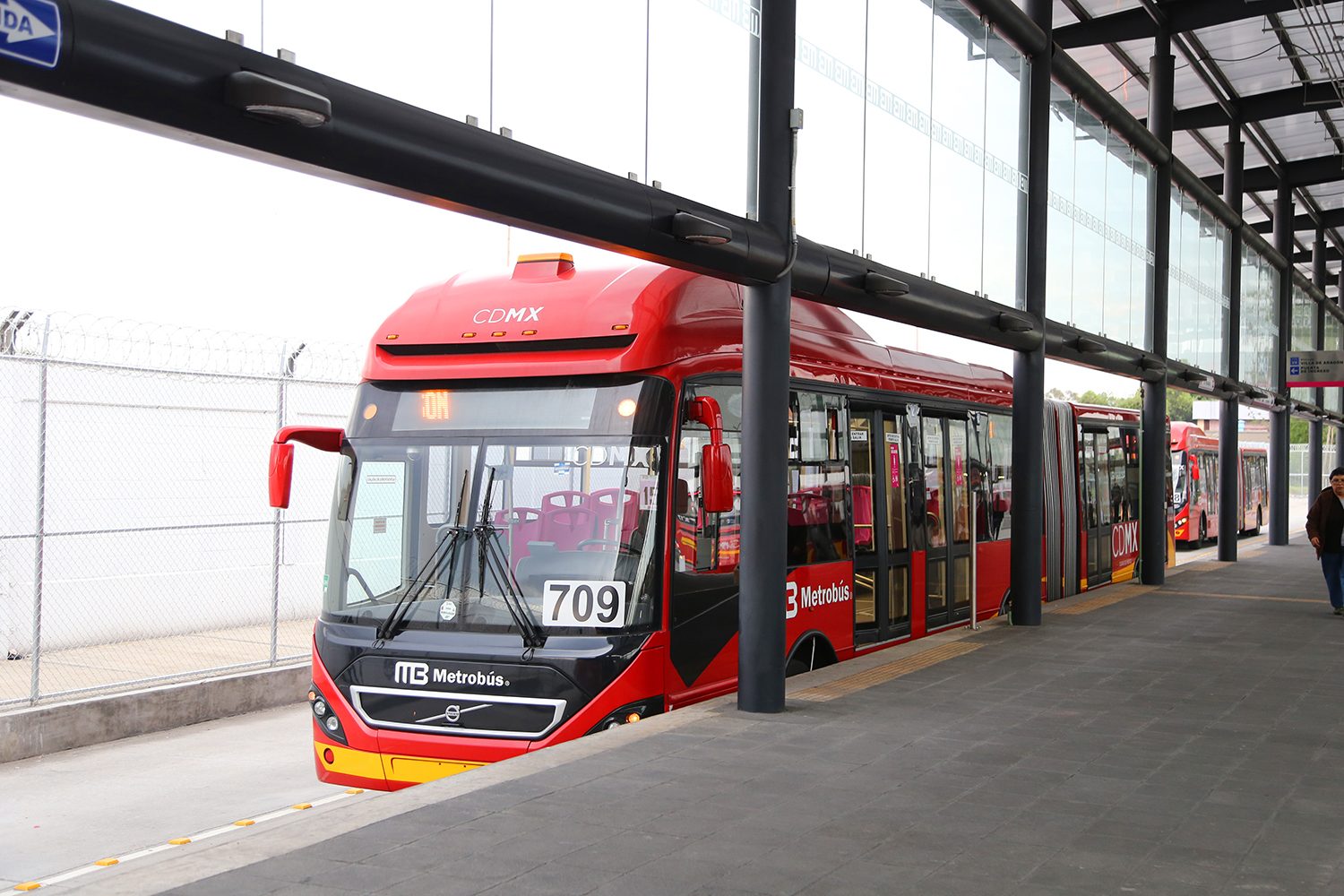
Metrobús BRT in Mexico City.

Hook has argued that BRT is often a more cost effective form of mass transit vis-à-vis rail-based alternatives, as it costs far less per kilometer/mile to build and offers more flexible service options. Citing the transformational effects of Cleveland's Healthline BRT, he argues that BRT is a more cost effective investment for stimulating transit-oriented development. Hook has also advocated for a clearer definition of "BRT" and was instrumental in developing the BRT Standard.

In addition to BRT advocacy, Hook has called for the enactment of a series of "livability" initiatives in U.S. cities. Such measures would include the creation of traffic demand management and congestion pricing systems similar to those implemented in London and Stockholm, ready access to efficient public transit, and the improvement and expansion of basic public amenities such as parks. He claims these developments would bolster urban viability, and have the effect of reducing greenhouse gas emissions, suburban sprawl, and traffic congestion. Additionally, they would improve air quality and reduce the incidence of respiratory disease, while creating a commensurate increase in quality of life for city dwellers, factors he asserts are critical for a city's economic growth and the satisfaction of their voter bases.

Hook has also called on U.S. cities to reevaluate the role of non-motorized vehicles such as bicycles and pedicabs as viable, non-polluting alternatives to automobile travel for short-distance trips. He avers that increasing such forms of transportation would alleviate the motor vehicle traffic congestion endemic to many U.S. cities, and suggests they enact reforms that would put the safety and convenience of cyclists and pedestrians at the forefront.

== Recent Publications ==
- Bus Rapid Transit Planning Guide (w/ Lloyd Wright, co-ed.), Institute for Transportation and Development Policy, June 2007.
- “Urban Transportation and the Millennium Development Goals,” Global Urban Development Magazine, Issue I, Volume 2, March, 2006.
- Training Course: Non-Motorized Transport. 2005. GTZ.
