= Sustainable Transport Award =

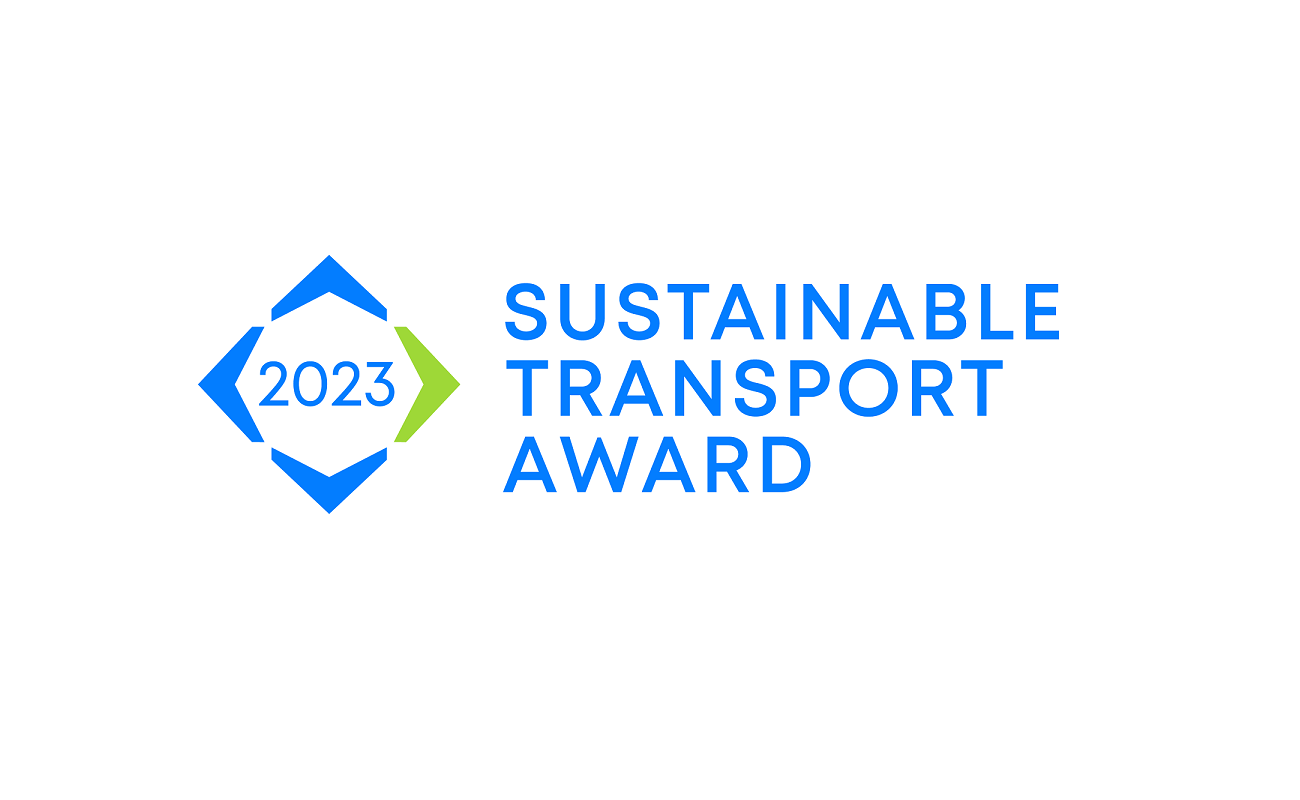
- Awarded for: Sustainable transportation and urban livability
- Description: Recognition of leadership in sustainable transportation and urban livability
- Sponsored by: Sustainable Transport Award Committee
- Country: International
- Presented by: Institute for Transportation and Development Policy (ITDP)
- Website: staward.org

The Sustainable Transport Award (STA) is presented annually to a city that has shown leadership and vision in the field of sustainable transportation and urban livability in the preceding year. Nominations are accepted from anyone, and winners and honorable mentions are chosen by the Sustainable Transport Award Steering Committee.

Since 2005, the award has been given out annually to a city or major jurisdiction that has implemented innovative transportation strategies, especially in several different areas of sustainable transportation. The award rewards cities for improving mobility for residents, reducing transportation greenhouse gas and air pollution emissions, and improving safety and access for bicyclists and pedestrians.The STA shows international interest in cities at the forefront of transportation policy. By highlighting successfully completed programs and emphasizing transferability, the award helps disseminate new ideas and best practices while encouraging cities worldwide to improve their own livability.

Noteworthy projects include the construction or expansion of BRT or LRT systems, bike shares or bike lanes, attention to low-income access to transportation, reform of parking or zoning regulations, and linking transportation and development practices (TOD).

== Process ==
=== Criteria ===
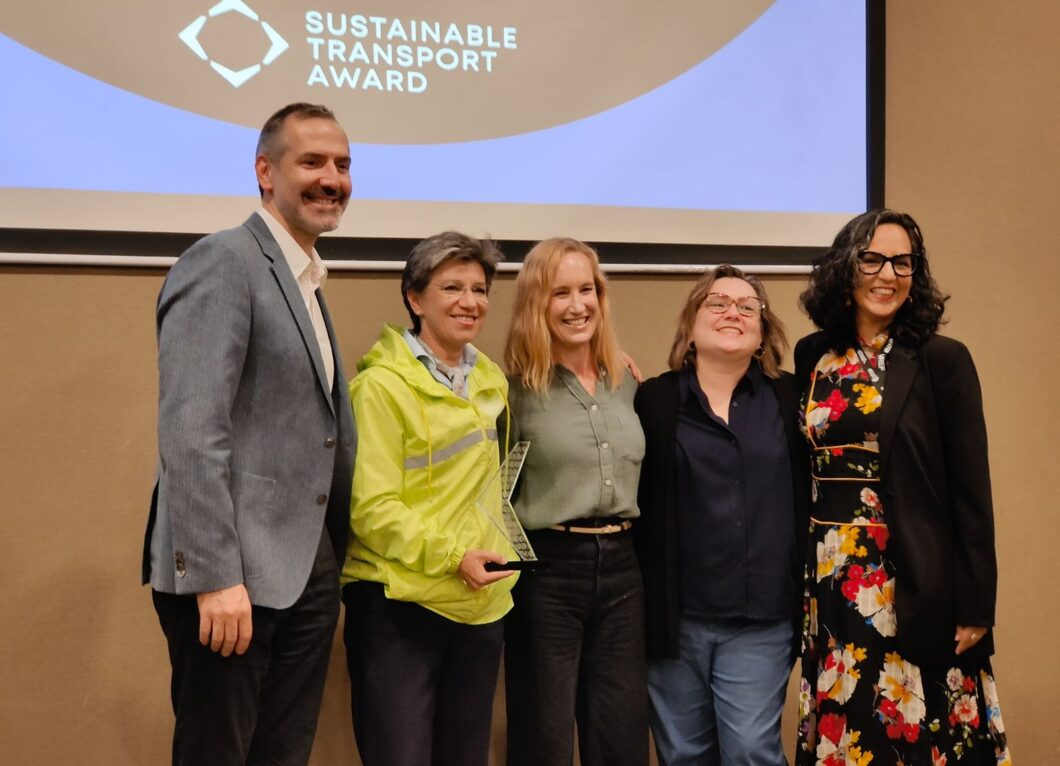
Bogotá's Mayor Claudia López Hernández accepts the 2022 STA in June 2023.

STAs are awarded to cities that have demonstrated significant progress in using transportation to create a more sustainable and livable city. The Sustainable Transport Award looks for cities working in several of the following policy areas:

- Improvements to public transportation, such as implementing a new mass transit system (e.g., bus rapid transit), expanding the existing systems to increase accessibility and coverage, or improving customer service.
- Improvements to non-motorized travel, such as the implementation or expansion of bike share programs and bike lanes, the creation of pedestrian walkways, and improvements to street crossings and sidewalks.
- Expansion or improvement of public space often includes the creation of open plazas, creating pedestrian-only zones, installing street lamps or trees along sidewalks, and pedestrian safety measures.
- Implementation of travel demand management programs to reduce private car use can include car-free days or zones, changes to parking requirements or availability, the implementation or expansion of car share systems, congestion charging, and structured tolls and fees.
- Reducing urban sprawl by linking transportation to development (TOD) can be done through changes to zoning laws and providing incentives to developers.
- Reduction of transport-related air pollution and greenhouse gas emissions by creating pollution laws, mandating air quality controls, restricting vehicle access, and creating an air advisory system.

To be eligible for an STA, cities must have made significant progress in the past year in addressing sustainable transit. Awards are presented for projects implemented in the previous year rather than for planned activities or simply beginning construction.

=== Nominations ===
Cities must be nominated to be considered for the award. Nominations can come from government agencies, including the Mayor's office, NGOs, consultants, academics, or anyone else with a close working knowledge of the city's projects. Applicants are asked to provide program details, impact, significance, outcomes, transferability, and images.

=== Steering Committee ===
Final selection of the award recipient and honorable mentions is conducted by a steering committee, composed of experts and organizations working internationally on sustainable transportation. The committee includes the Institute for Transportation and Development Policy (ITDP), World Resources Institute, World Bank, GIZ, Asian Development Bank, Clean Air Asia, ICLEI, and Despacio. The committee looks for projects completed in the previous year that demonstrate innovation and success in improving sustainable transportation.

== Past winners ==
- 2005: Bogotá, Colombia
- 2006: Seoul, South Korea
- 2007: Guayaquil, Ecuador
- 2008: Paris, France and London, United Kingdom
- 2009: New York City, United States
- 2010: Ahmedabad, India
- 2011: Guangzhou, China
- 2012: Medellín, Colombia and San Francisco, United States
- 2013: Mexico City, Mexico
- 2014: Buenos Aires, Argentina
- 2015: Belo Horizonte, Rio de Janeiro, and São Paulo, Brazil
- 2016: Yichang, China
- 2017: Santiago, Chile
- 2018: Dar es Salaam, Tanzania
- 2019: Fortaleza, Brazil
- 2020: Pune, India
- 2021: Jakarta, Indonesia
- 2022: Bogotá, Colombia
- 2023: Paris, France
- 2024: Tianjin, China
