= Institute for Transportation and Development Policy =

American non-profit organization

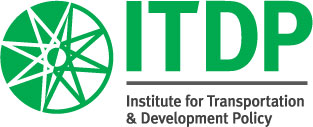
- Founder: Michael Replogle
- Established: 1985
- CEO: Heather Thompson
- Address: 9 E. 19th St. New York, NY
- Location: New York, New York, United States (Headquarters)
- Website: www.itdp.org

The Institute for Transportation and Development Policy (ITDP) is an American non-governmental non-profit organization that focuses on developing bus rapid transit (BRT) systems, promoting biking, walking, and non-motorized transport, and improving private bus operator margins. Other programs include parking reform, traffic demand management, and global climate and transport policy. According to its mission statement, ITDP is committed to "promoting sustainable and equitable transportation worldwide."

In addition to its role supporting and consulting local governmental efforts to develop more sustainable transportation, ITDP publishes the magazine Sustainable Transport annually, produces the BRT Standard and other research, and sits on the committee for the annual Sustainable Transport Award.

== Overview ==
ITDP was founded in 1985 by Michael Replogle and other sustainable transport advocates in the United States to counteract the spread of costly and environmentally damaging car-centric urban development models, and to promote biking, walking, and public transit in transportation planning.

In its first ten years, ITDP worked to support and grow local bicycle industries in Haiti, Nicaragua, Mozambique, South Africa, and West Africa. By 1989, ITDP's Bikes Not Bombs campaign had shipped 10,000 second-hand bicycles to support health and education efforts in Nicaragua and used these to establish a bicycle assembly industry in that country. ITDP advocated for the redirection of lending activity by the World Bank and other multi-lateral institutions. Where these global institutions had an exclusive focus on road projects, ITDP worked to open up funding for multi-modal transport solutions. ITDP advocated for sustainable transport initiatives in U.S. transportation policy, influencing the 1991 Intermodal Surface Transportation Efficiency Act (ISTEA). Responding to ITDP pressure, the Peace Corps put its volunteers on bicycles rather than motorcycles.

In the early 1990s, ITDP helped establish the Transport Sector Task Force, an advisory panel to the US Treasury Department's Multi-lateral Development Bank liaison office, to comment on specific transport projects. In its 1994 study "Counting on Cars, Counting Out People" ITDP published a preliminary set of guidelines for reforming the World Bank Transport Sector economic appraisal to make it less biased in favor of motorways. The report's key recommendation that economic impacts on non-motorized road users be included in the appraisal has been incorporated into World Bank practice.

ITDP has offices in seven countries, with projects and relationships in over 100 cities worldwide.

In 2009, former mayor of Bogotá, Colombia Enrique Peñalosa, who was instrumental in the establishment of that city's TransMilenio BRT system, was elected as President of the Board of Directors of ITDP. Walter B. Hook served as the organizations executive director from 1993 to 2014. Heather Thompson is ITDP's interim CEO.

== Key areas of operation ==
=== Public transport ===
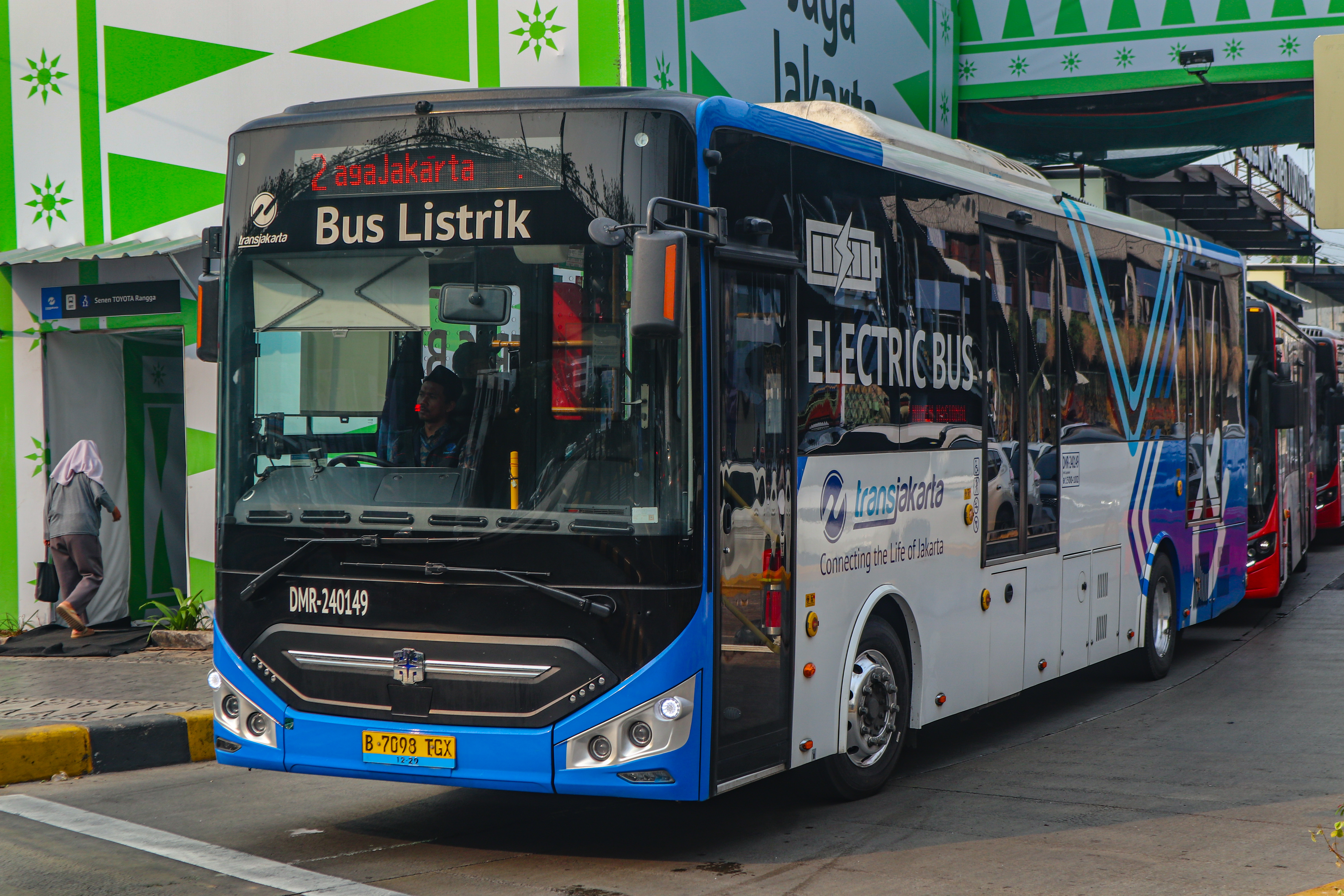
A Transjakarta bus serving Corridor 2 (Pulo Gadung–Monumen Nasional)

ITDP works to encourage safe, modern, and efficient public transportation systems in cities worldwide. ITDP is currently active in a design and/or consulting capacity in the BRT programs of Ahmedabad, India; Dar es Salaam, Tanzania; Johannesburg, South Africa (Rea Vaya); Jakarta, Indonesia (Transjakarta); Guangzhou, Lanzhou, and Yichang, China; Mexico City, Mexico, Buenos Aires, Argentina, and more.

In June 2007, ITDP published the Bus Rapid Transit Planning Guide along with the United Nations Environment Programme, the Deutsche Gesellschaft für Technische Zusammenarbeit (GTZ), the Hewlett Foundation, and Viva. The guide draws from the extensive BRT design experience of Latin American transit planners, and aims to disseminate this information in the US and other countries around the world. The guide is currently available in English, Spanish, Portuguese, and Chinese, and is free for download in .pdf format from the ITDP website.

In addition, ITDP developed the BRT Standard, a design guide and rating system for Bus Rapid Transit systems around the world. The Standard establishes a common definition for BRT and identifies BRT best practices, as well as functioning as a scoring system to allow BRT corridors to be evaluated and recognized for their superior design and management aspects. It uses a systematic method of evaluating BRT systems, rating their quality as "gold, silver, or bronze". Some systems that had been branded as BRT failed to meet even minimal standards distinguishing BRT from regular urban bus service. A related report on BRT in the US noted that "Some American systems reviewed had so few essential characteristics that calling them a BRT system at all does a disservice to efforts to gain broader adoption of BRT in the United States...These systems, with relatively few BRT characteristics, have helped confuse the American public about what exactly constitutes BRT."

=== Cycling and walking ===
ITDP encourages urban design that prioritizes human-powered forms of transportation, such as walking, cycling, and the use of rickshaws. Specifically, ITDP often works with cities to encourage car-free days and bike share programs, create safe streets for pedestrians and cyclists, and provide high-quality bicycles.

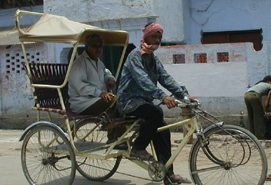
A modernized cycle rickshaw in Vrindavan, India

In December 2013 the ITDP published the Bike-Share Planning Guide with the aim "to bridge the divide between developing and developed countries' experiences with bike-share." The guide is expected to be useful for planning and implementing a bike sharing system regardless of the location, size, or density of the city. The guide is currently available only in English and is free for download in .pdf format from the ITDP website.

ITDP works with local governments on the expansion and design of bike lanes, and pedestrian networks throughout the city. In São Paulo, Brazil, ITDP assisted in the design of a pilot bicycle path in the neighborhood of Butantã. For the project, ITDP commissioned a report for a 58 kilometer feeder network, which will lead cyclists from adjacent streets and sidewalks to the bicycle path. The path will pass through a high-visibility corridor of the city, and if successfully implemented could be expanded to surrounding neighborhoods and throughout the city.

Past projects have included a redesign of India's traditional cycle rickshaw in collaboration with local experts, reducing the weight of the vehicles by 30% and adding a multi-gear system to increase efficiency; increasing Africa's cycling capacity while bolstering local industry through the establishment of the California Bike Coalition (CBC); and traffic impact and mitigation analysis along with outreach to local interest groups in the pedestrianization of Malioboro Road in Yogyakarta, Indonesia.

=== Sustainable urban development ===
ITDP works to integrate transport and smart urban design to help remake cities and suburbs into livable spaces that foster economic opportunities, encourage low carbon lifestyles, and attract residents. This is done through designing environments for cycling and walking, fostering the development of pedestrian and transit based real estate development, and creating policies that help turn cultural and physical spaces into economic assets.

In November 2013 ITDP published "The TOD Standard" which elaborates eight key principles for guiding the implementation of transit-oriented development (TOD). The guide is available for download in .pdf format from the ITDP website.

ITDP has initiated advised on a number of projects in cities around the world. ITDP worked with the Mexico City government to provide technical support for the revitalization of Mexico City's Historic Center. ITDP managed the planning and implementation efforts of the revitalization, in addition to promoting street maintenance and cleanliness, supplementation of public security, and the management and controlling of parking and street vending activity in the area. ITDP claims that this reorientation of the Historic Center towards pedestrian and transit oriented development will reverse decades of deterioration, attract tourism and investment, and improve air quality in the notoriously polluted city. Additionally, ITDP participated as part of the team developing Mexico City's Bicycle Master Plan to design routes that connect to the Historic Center, further integrating multi-modal development of the area.

=== International sustainable transport policy ===
ITDP co-founded the Partnership on Sustainable Low Carbon Transport (SLoCaT) in 2009 and through that helped secure in 2012 a $175 billion 10-year commitment from the world's largest multilateral development banks to support sustainable transport, with annual reporting and monitoring. Working with SLoCaT, ITDP helped mainstream sustainable transport strategies in the United Nations' post-2015 development agenda and in discussions of climate change mitigation strategies in the run-up to the 2015 global climate summit in Paris (COP-15). With the University of California Davis, ITDP in 2014 published, A Global High Shift Scenario: Impacts and Potential for More Public Transport, Walking, and Cycling With Lower Car Use, showing how a shift in transport funding to support alternatives to more driving could save over $100 trillion cumulatively for consumers and governments by 2050 while cutting cumulative climate change pollution from urban transport by 25% and improving equity of access to opportunities for the poor. This is available on the ITDP website.

== See also ==
- BRT creep
- BRT Standard
- Enrique Peñalosa
