= Criticism of bus rapid transit =

Criticisms of bus rapid transit

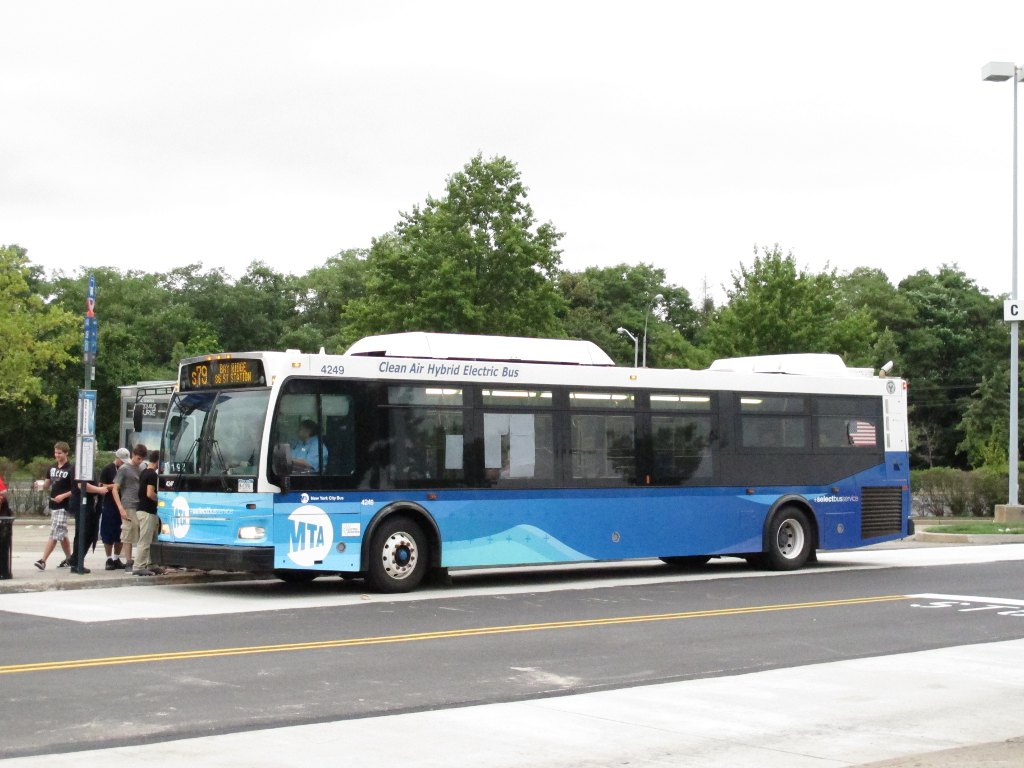
S79 SBS bus at Staten Island Mall. The Select Bus Service (SBS) system is sometimes criticized for not meeting the ITDP BRT Standard due to lack of ticket machines and level boarding.

Bus rapid transit (BRT) has been criticized, including arguments that light or heavy rail would better fit corridors, higher operating costs than rail, environmental impact, and some BRT systems not meeting established standards.

== Comparison with rail services ==
The main critique of BRT is its inability to match rail. For example, rail systems generally attract more transit-oriented development because there are fewer barriers to changing or removing a bus service than a rail service. "Because the locations of bus routes are not fixed or permanent, this greatly increases the risk of investing in transit-supportive land-use development", according to a 2002 California Department of Transportation study.

Another argument is that BRT attracts fewer riders and has a lower maximum capacity than light rail. According to Simon Fraser University professor Anthony Perl in the Wall Street Journal, "Rail has a proven record of being able to take people out of their cars; buses don't." Light rail usually has a higher capacity than BRT, making it a "better option" for larger transit systems, such as Bogotá, Colombia, where their first metro line is currently under construction.

=== Operating costs ===
BRT is also often criticized for its higher operating costs compared to conventional rail. Parametric cost models suggest that, under high-cost scenarios, BRT can have peak operating costs up to 24% higher than similar rail based services. While rail allows a single operator to move high volumes of passengers, BRT requires multiple buses and drivers for the same capacity. According to the Federal Transit Administration, the average useful life of a bus is about 14 years, whereas the useful life of a rail car is 31 years. Which means a bus generally has to be replaced roughly twice as often as a train. Typically, roads need repaving every 10–15 years and major replacement every 30 years, while rails should be replaced every 30 years.

== Standards non-compliance ==
Some implementations, sometimes described by transit critics as BRT "lite", are viewed as incremental improvements to conventional bus service rather than "full" BRT. The Institute for Transportation and Development Policy has published the BRT Standard in an attempt to improve consistency in terminology.

Due to BRT sharing many characteristics with traditional bus transit, there are fewer barriers to removing expensive or difficult to implement features. This flexibility can result in initial service improvements being gradually scaled back after a route is launched, especially when driven by financial and/or political pressures. This gradual reduction of dedicated transit features is referred to as "BRT creep" by some North American commentators.

For example, a writer for the Virginia blog The Arlandrian urged residents to use the ITDP scoring worksheet (BRT Standard) to evaluate local BRT proposals. Washington D.C. area writer Dan Reed says when BRT systems are scaled back, the results are "bad for commuters, but it's also bad for taxpayers who were sold a high-end service only to find out that we just painted the buses a different color".

Dan Malouff, a northern Virginia transportation planner, writes in an opinion piece republished by The Washington Post that "there are a thousand corners like that you can cut that individually may or may not hurt too much, but collectively add up to the difference between BRT and a regular bus", citing examples such as shared or HOV lanes instead of dedicated lanes, traditional stops instead of full-featured stations, no fare pre-payment, and no traffic signal priority. Detroit writer Michael Jackman similarly identifies the removal of "signal pre-emption, dedicated lanes separated by concrete berms, heated, ADA-compliant stations, preticketing, and more" as evidence of similar patterns.

== Counterarguments ==
In 2013, journalist Matthew Yglesias, writing in an Slate Magazine editorial, calls "BRT creep" a genuine concern, while arguing that "I don't think you should see that as a problem with buses, it's a problem with cheapskates".

== See also ==
- Guided busway
- List of bus rapid transit systems
