= Michael Replogle =

American transport consultant

Michael A. Replogle
- Education: University of Pennsylvania (B.A. Cum Laude, Sociology); University of Pennsylvania School of Engineering and Applied Science (B.S.E. Cum Laude, Civil and Urban Engineering); University of Pennsylvania (Master of Science, Civil and Urban Engineering)
- Occupations: Former Deputy Commissioner for Policy, New York City Department of Transportation

Michael Replogle is an internationally recognized expert and advisor in the field of sustainable transport. He co-founded the Institute for Transportation and Development Policy (ITDP) in 1985, a nonprofit organization that promotes environmentally sustainable and equitable transportation projects and policies worldwide, as well as Bikes Not Bombs in 1984. He was the president of ITDP from 1985 to 1992 and 1998–2009, and managing director of ITDP from 2009 to 2015. His seminal 1987 paper on sustainable transport was the first to define the term. In 2024, his expert testimony led to a pathbreaking settlement of a lawsuit between Hawai'i Department of Transportation and 13 youth plaintiffs, represented by Our Children's Trust and Earthjustice, for a statewide plan to decarbonize transportation by 2045, achieving a 50% reduction by 2030, with 5-year targets and annual reporting.

Replogle served as Deputy Commissioner for Policy of the New York City Department of Transportation from June 2015 to June 2021, developing strategy and advising the city on transportation management and innovation. He managed DOT's Policy Division which prepared and implemented agency-wide strategy, advancing Vision Zero efforts to eliminate road-crash related deaths and serious injuries, and shaping freight and parking strategy, climate change mitigation and resiliency, and shared mobility. His vision for a decentralized, bottoms-up, rights-based NYC's Open Restaurants Program led to the conversion of 10,000 parking spaces to street cafes within a matter of weeks, saving over 100,000 jobs in the restaurant industry during COVID and transforming the city. He played a key role in expanding the CitiBike system from 6,000 shared bikes to 33,000, developing e-freight cycling, car-sharing, and scooter-sharing. He managed NYC's Electric Vehicle Roadmap and EV charging pilot programs. He supported the city's engagement with the Metropolitan Transportation Authority and Port Authority, federal transportation policy and grants, transportation elements of the city's neighborhood development plans, and enhancing access for persons with disabilities. He helped win action by New York State DOT to deconstruct the Sheridan Expressway in the Bronx.

Replogle co-founded the Partnership on Sustainable, Low Carbon Transport (SLoCaT) in 2009 and through that helped secure a $175 billion 10-year commitment from the world's largest multilateral development banks to support sustainable transport, with annual reporting and monitoring. Michael Replogle was board chairman of the SLoCaT Foundation 2012–16. Replogle managed development of new tools and methods to evaluate greenhouse gas emissions and other impacts of transportation projects and programs for the Asian Development Bank and Global Environment Facility with CAI-Asia.

As transportation director of the Environmental Defense Fund from 1992 to 2009, he influenced U.S. federal transportation and environmental legislation and regulations, frequently testifying in the U.S. Congress. He has advised on metropolitan transportation plans and policies in Washington, Baltimore, New York, Denver, Atlanta, Portland (OR), Mexico City, Beijing, and other areas to promote more integrated transportation and land use planning, public transportation, sound transport pricing, and transportation system management and operations. He managed integrated transport and land use planning and modeling for Montgomery County, Maryland from 1983 to 1992.

He was a member of the Advisory Committee for the United Nations Centre for Regional Development and an active emeritus member of the Transportation Research Board Committee on Transportation in the Developing Countries, which he helped found. He has been a long-time advisor to the U.S. Department of Transportation (DOT), most recently through its advisory committees on Transportation Statistics and Intelligent Transportation and travel modeling. He served on the World Economic Forum Global Agenda Council on the Future of Transportation. Since 2020, he has been a member of the U.S. Environmental Protection Agency's Mobile Source Technical Review Subcommittee.

Replogle received an M.E.S. and Honor B.E.S. in Civil and Urban Engineering and an Honor Bachelor of Arts in Sociology, all from the University of Pennsylvania.

Replogle is the author of a book on access to public transportation, a seminal report for the World Bank on non-motorized transportation in Asian cities, several hundred magazine articles, and dozens of journal articles and reports.

He was married to Linda Frazee Baker, a literary translator and senior government executive, from 1986 until her death in 2020.

== Select publications ==
• Replogle, M. with Colin Hughes, "Moving Toward Sustainable Transport," 2012 State of The World Report, Worldwatch Institute, Washington, DC.

• Replogle, M., "Environmental Evaluation in Urban Transport," in Harry T. Dimitriou & Ralph Gackenheimer (eds.), Urban Transport in the Developing World Edward Elgar Publishers (2011).

• DeCorla-Souza, P., & Replogle, M. A. Accelerating Implementation of an Express Transit Network on Priced Managed Lanes With Active Traffic and Demand Management and Public-Private Partnerships. Public Works Management & Policy, 0(0). (2025) https://doi.org/10.1177/1087724X251356464

• Replogle, M. No More Just Throwing Money Out the Window: Using Road Tolls to Cut Congestion, Protect the Environment, and Boost Access for All, Environmental Defense Fund. (2008)

• https://www.epw.senate.gov/public/_cache/files/c/b/cb50379a-5710-412e-a939-5af70161065e/89E04E200A7DD6ADF92751A045565F90.03.06.2019-replogle-testimony.pdf Testimony of Michael Replogle, Deputy Commissioner for Policy, New York City Department of Transportation, Before Senate Committee on Environment and Public Works, hearing on Infrastructure Investment, March 6, 2019].

• Replogle, M. Intelligent Transportation Systems for Sustainable Communities, National Policy Conference on Intelligent Transportation Systems and the Environment, U.S. Department of Transportation (1994).

• Replogle, M. with Harriet Parcells, Linking bicycle/pedestrian facilities with transit: enhancing bicycle and pedestrian access to transit, U.S. Federal Highway Administration (1992).

• Replogle, M. "Sustainability: A Vital Concept for Transportation Planning and Development," Journal of Advanced Transportation (1990).

• Replogle, M., Non-Motorized Vehicles in Asian Cities, prepared as part of the World Bank Asia Urban Transport Sector Study, (1990).

• Replogle, M. Bicycles and Public Transportation: New Links to Suburban Transit Markets, Rodale Press (1983).
