= BRT Standard =

Definition of best practices for bus rapid transit corridors

Document defining the 2016 BRT Standard

The BRT Standard is an evaluation tool for bus rapid transit (BRT) corridors around the world, based on international best practices. The Standard establishes a common definition for BRT and identifies BRT best practices, as well as functioning as a scoring system to allow BRT corridors to be evaluated and recognized for their superior design and management aspects.

The Standard was conceived by the Institute for Transportation and Development Policy (ITDP) in 2012 to ensure that BRT corridors worldwide meet a minimum quality standard and deliver consistent passenger, economic, and environmental benefits. This is of particular relevance in countries where "BRTs qualify for special funding from national or provincial governments. In addition to serving as an overview of BRT design elements, the Standard can be used to evaluate existing BRT corridors and certify them as a Basic, Bronze, Silver, or Gold rated corridors. Corridors which fail to meet minimum standards for Basic ratings are not considered to be BRT. The latest edition of the Standard was published in 2024.

Systems which do not meet the BRT standard ("Not BRT" by the ITDP), but are 'marketed' as BRT, can be known as "BRT creep or BRT Lite".

== History and purpose ==
First released in 2012, the BRT Standard was created “to establish a common definition of bus rapid transit (BRT) and ensure that BRT corridors more uniformly deliver world-class passenger experiences, significant economic benefits, and positive environmental impact”. The Standard was developed in response to a lack of consensus among planners and engineers as to what constitutes a true BRT corridor. Without a clear definition, the term BRT was used for corridors that provided only minor improvements in bus service and lacked the elements of BRT that make it competitive with light rail or metro alternatives. This caused a backlash against the BRT "brand", and confusion as to its benefits.

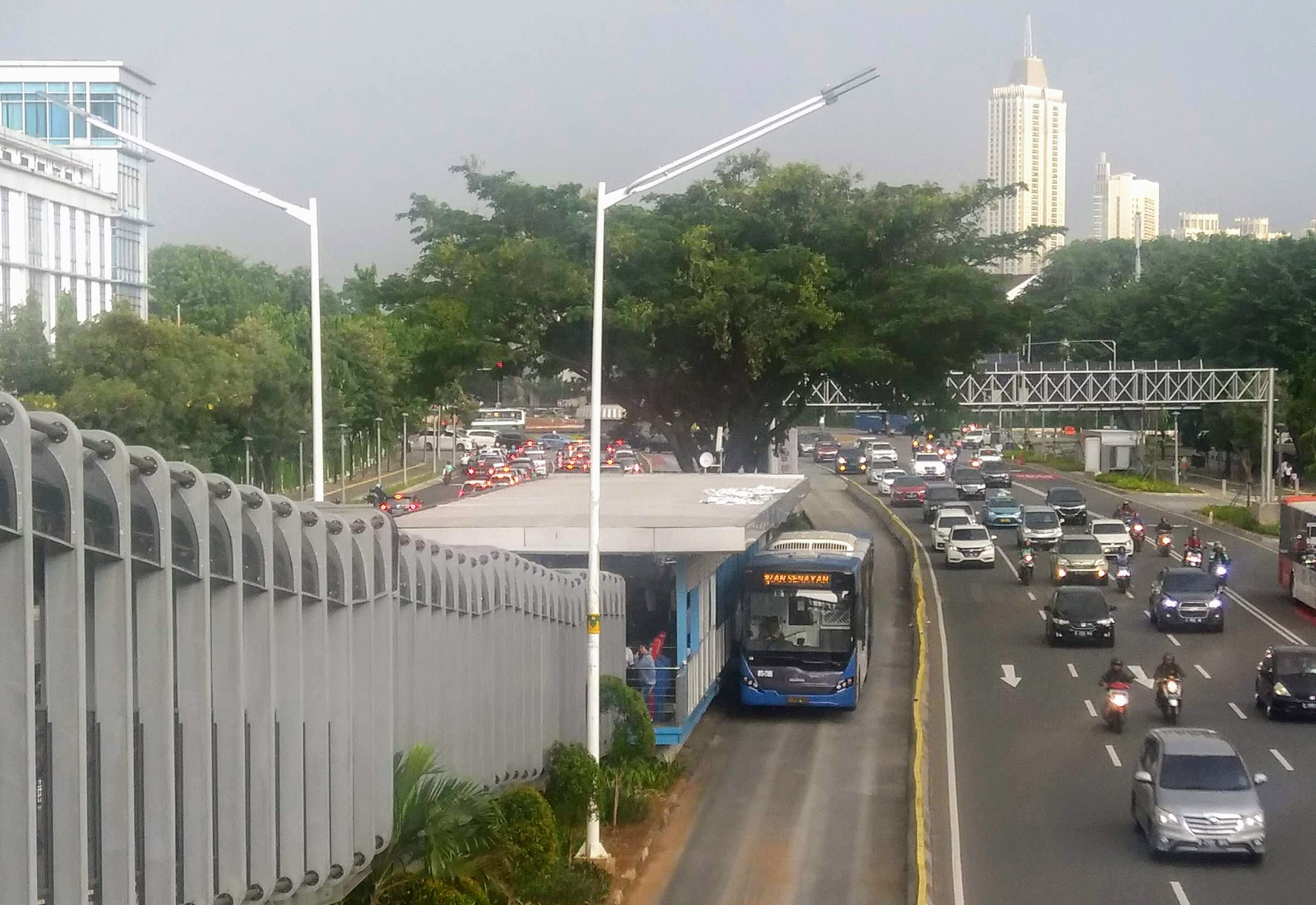
A Transjakarta bus on a dedicated bus lane, an exclusive right-of-way separated from heavy traffic.

The 2014 edition made some improvements to the methodology, including adjustments to the corridor definition, infrequent-service penalties, and increased emphasis on basics. In order to allow BRT corridors in downtown areas to qualify as BRT, the definition of a BRT corridor has been reduced to a minimum of 3 km (1.9 mi) in length. The peak and off-peak frequency design metrics have been removed, and penalties for low peak and off-peak frequencies have been added. An additional point was added to each of the BRT basic elements, to put greater emphasis on the basic elements of a BRT corridor.

The 2016 edition proposed six major changes, including greater focus on safety and system operations, separation of the design score and the full score (i.e. including both design and operations), improved dedicated right-of-way definition, new types of busway alignments, and partial points for onboard fare validation.

The latest BRT Standard, 2024 edition, is the product of feedback from BRT practitioners around the world. Suggestions were formulated into concrete proposals and evaluated by the BRT Standard Technical Committee, a group of leading BRT engineers, designers, and planners. The Standard has been refreshed by adding, combining, and revising elements based on expert feedback and increasing deductions for operations. The most significant changes include an expanded focus on gender, safety, and access; more attention to climate, greening, and resiliency; an improved passenger and customer experience; and a new focus on business operations.

== Technical Committee and Institutional Endorsers ==
The Technical Committee of The BRT Standard comprises experts on BRT. This committee serves as a source of technical advice with respect to BRT and is the basis for establishing the credibility of The BRT Standard. The Technical Committee certifies corridors and recommends revisions to The Standard as needed.

The Institutional Endorsers are an integrated group of institutions in the fields of city building, public transport systems, and climate change with decision-making abilities over the BRT Standard certification process. The endorsers establish the strategic direction of the BRT Standard, ensure that BRT projects ranked by the scoring system uphold the goals of the BRT Standard, and promote the BRT Standard as a quality check for BRT projects.

== Definition of BRT ==
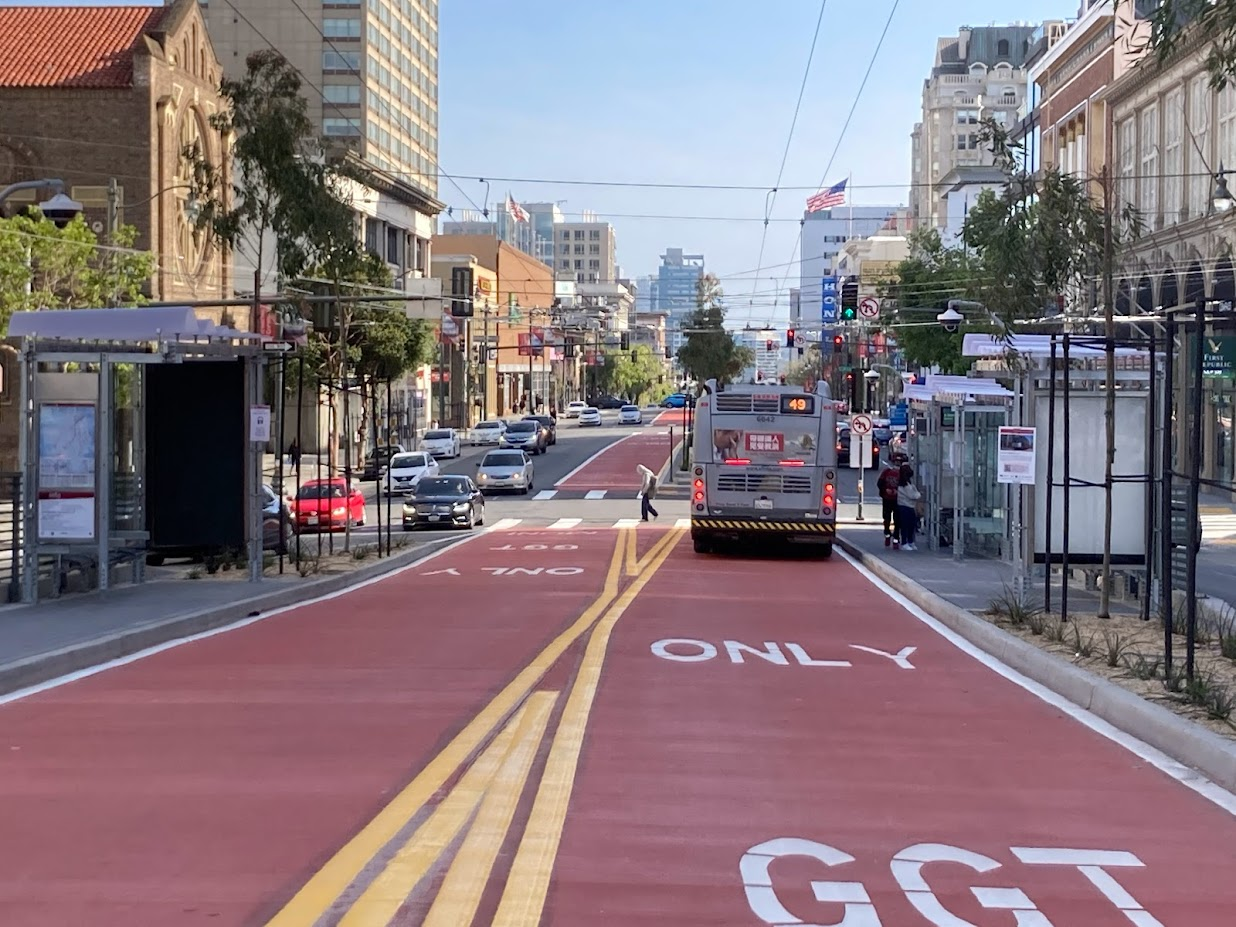
Center of roadway or bus-only corridors keep buses away from the busy curbside, as seen here in San Francisco, USA.

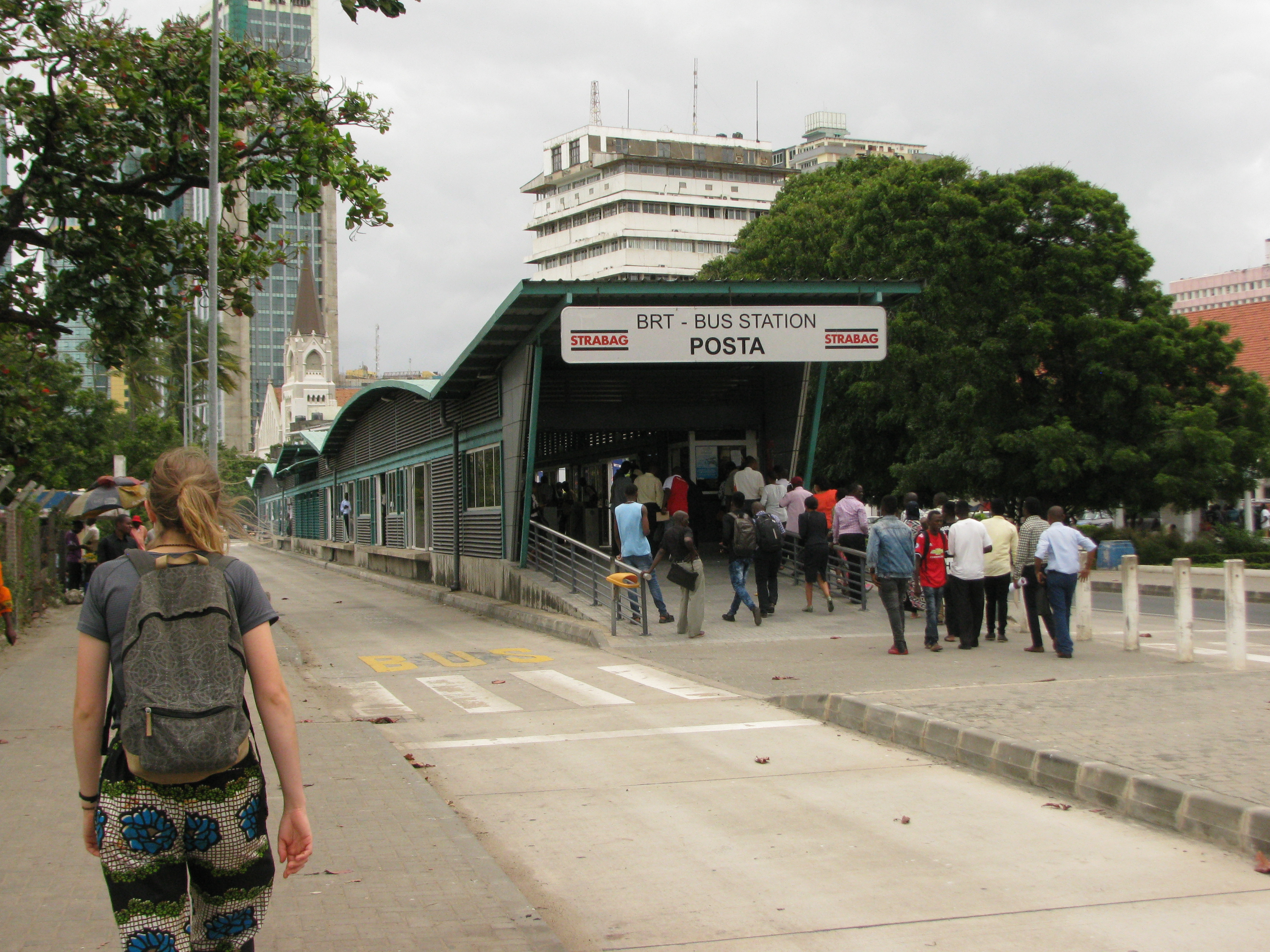
BRT stations should be at level with the bus for quick and easy boarding, as seen here in Dar es Salaam, Tanzania.

BRT is a high-capacity bus-based transit system that delivers fast, reliable, high quality, safe, and cost-effective services at relatively low cost, metro-level capacities. It achieves that through dedicated bus lanes that are median aligned, off-board fare collection, level boarding, bus priority at intersections, and fast and frequent operations. Because BRT contains features similar to a light rail or metro system, it is much more reliable, convenient and faster than regular bus services. The three main delays facing public transport are 1) boarding and alighting, 2) intersections, and 3) traffic congestion. BRT solves for all three. With the right features, BRT is able to avoid the causes of delay that typically slow regular bus services, while also improving service quality, safety and security, and passenger experience.

=== Basic characteristics ===
There are five essential characteristics of a BRT corridor.

- Dedicated right-of-way: Bus-only lanes make for faster travel and ensure that buses are never delayed due to mixed traffic congestion.
- Busway Alignment: Center of roadway or bus-only corridor keeps buses away from the busy curbside where cars are parking, standing, and turning.
- Off-board fare collection: Fare payment at the station, instead of on the bus, eliminates the delay caused by passengers waiting to pay on board.
- Intersection Treatments: Prohibiting turns for traffic across the bus lane reduces delays caused to buses by turning traffic. Prohibiting such turns is the most important measure for moving buses through intersections – more important even than signal priority.
- Platform-level boarding: The station should be at level with the bus for quick and easy boarding. This also makes it fully accessible for wheelchairs, disabled passengers, strollers and carts with minimal delays.

== Standard scoring ==
The BRT Standard has defined 5 main categories for design with 32 metrics totaling 100 points and an operational deductions category that has 13 metrics totaling 77 points. Together, these form the total score for the corridor. Both design and operations are critical to creating a high quality BRT corridor. Design decisions are often locked in planning and construction. We often see corridors score well here, getting a bronze or above in design, but then do poorly in operations, dropping their overall score.

While operational deductions may bring the overall score down, these are aspects that can be easily improved in order to improve the score. From there, the updated scoring details can be found in the 2024 BRT Standard with detailed guidance on how to score. The Standard only evaluates a corridor and not a whole system, since different corridors can vary widely in design and quality. Certifying a BRT corridor as Gold, Silver, Bronze, or Basic sets an internationally recognized standard for the current best practices for BRT and can only be done with the full score (Design + Operational Deductions) six months after opening to allow usage and operations to be more representative of longer-term patterns. The combination of the design evaluation (positive points) and operational evaluation (negative points) gives the final score from the BRT Standard.

== Criticisms ==
The BRT Standard has been noted as a one-size-fits-all tool that is not context sensitive. Also, pro-car politicians' opposition to public transit may result in higher construction costs and greater land acquisition needs whenever a public transit agency sets a Gold Standard goal. In one recent case in Indianapolis, State Senator Aaron Freeman, a former auto industry lobbyist and an aggressive opponent of public transit, threatened to introduce a bill that would kill the IndyGo Blue Line project that was aiming for Gold classification unless IndyGo agreed to share lanes with private civilian cars for at least 70% of the BRT route. Freeman's hostility towards public transit resulted in high costs and land acquisition needs for IndyGo to meet his demands so he would withdraw his anti-transit bill.

In response to that criticism, those in favor of the Standard point out that the overwhelming majority of the Standard elements work well and would also benefit lower demand systems. Above all, BRT designers should take advantage of the flexibility inherent in bus systems and consider lower-standard busway sections to avoid physical or political constraints, especially where such sections can later be upgraded to address future demand increases.

There are many situations where lower-grade BRT or non-BRT bus schemes are the appropriate solution to upgrade public transit. The Standard should not be a reason to forgo such improvements. However, in many cases, the Standard provides a scoring tool that can motivate cities to develop high quality mass transit corridors where possible under the city's prevailing financial and spatial conditions.

== See also ==
- Criticism of bus rapid transit — alleged application of the term "BRT" to bus systems that fall short of its design and performance standards
