= Bus rapid transit =

Public transportation system

Transjakarta in Jakarta, the longest BRT system in the world (264.6 km)

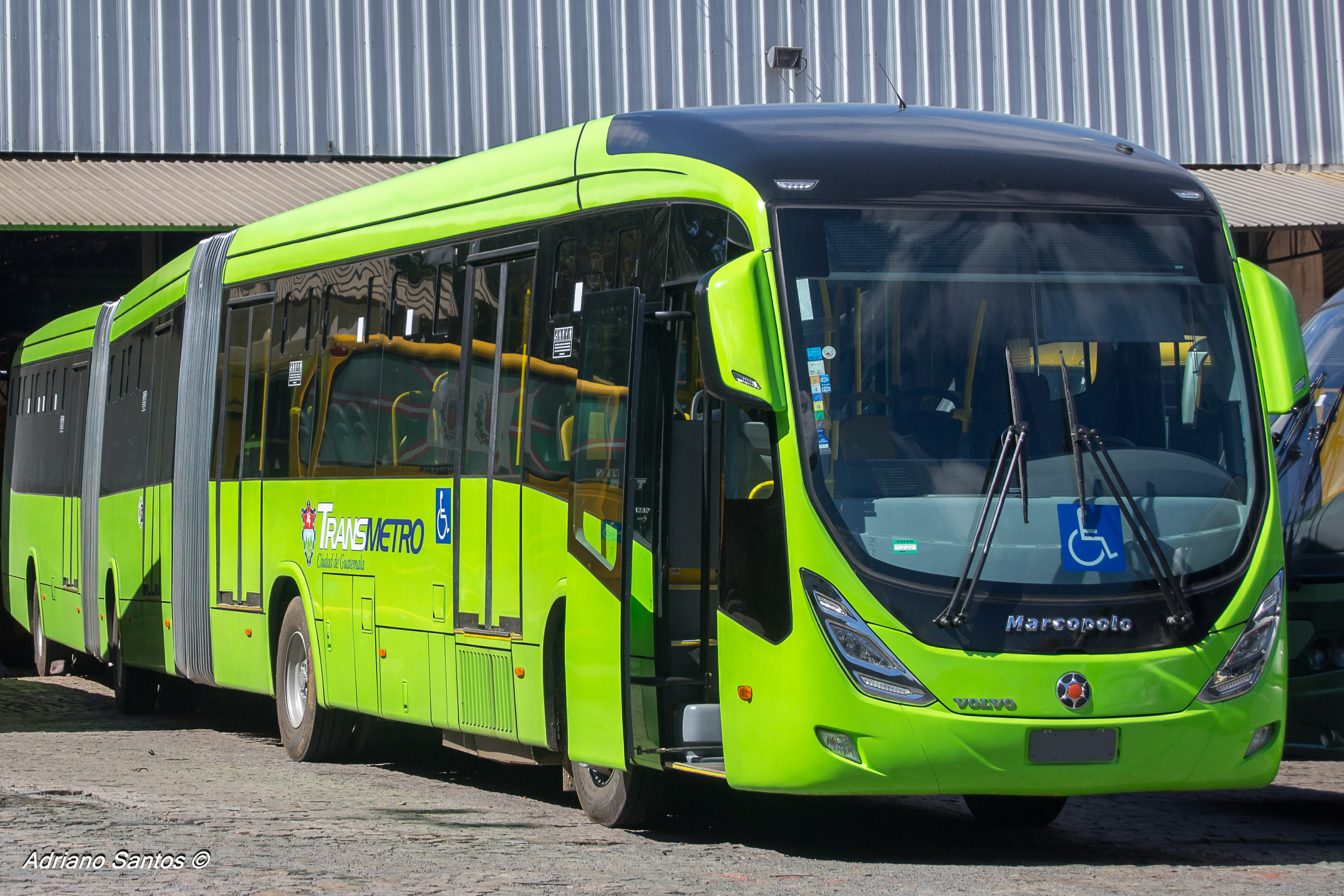
Bi-articulated buses 30 meter long Transmetro in Guatemala City, for 300 passengers

Bus rapid transit (BRT), also referred to as a busway or transitway, is a trolleybus, electric bus, or bus service system designed to have higher capacity, reliability, and other quality features than a conventional bus system. Typically, a BRT system includes roadways that are dedicated to buses, and gives priority to buses at intersections where buses may interact with other traffic, alongside design features to reduce delays caused by passengers boarding or disembarking buses, or paying fares. BRT aims to combine the capacity and speed of a light rail transit (LRT) or mass rapid transit (MRT) system with the flexibility, lower cost and simplicity of a bus system.

Although some cities, such as Lima, Liège and Runcorn, pioneered segregated busway systems with some BRT features, the first city to fully integrate every BRT feature into a single system was Curitiba with the Rede Integrada de Transporte in 1974. As of March 2018, a total of 166 cities in six continents have implemented BRT systems, accounting for 4,906 km (3,048 mi) of BRT lanes and about 32.2 million passengers every day. The majority of these are in Latin America, where about 19.6 million passengers ride daily, and which has the most cities with BRT systems, with 54, led by Brazil with 21 cities. The Latin American countries with the most daily ridership are Brazil (10.7 million), Colombia (3.0 million), and Mexico (2.5 million). In the other regions, China (4.3 million) and Iran (2.1 million) stand out. Currently, Transjakarta is the largest BRT network in the world, with about 264.6 kilometres (164.4 mi) of corridors connecting the Indonesian capital city.

BRT can carry far more passengers than a conventional bus service. Most busy systems move 15,000 to 25,000 passengers per hour in each direction, with the systems in Bogotá and Istanbul reaching approximately 45,000. Typical speeds are 27 to 48 km/h, which is faster than ordinary city traffic. BRT usually costs much less to build than light rail or metro: a United States study found busways cost about $13.5 million per mile against $34.8 million for light rail. BRT can cut air pollution compared with conventional buses and cars, especially with electric or hybrid buses, although diesel buses still cause pollution and noise. Some systems have struggled with overcrowding, long waits, safety problems and loss of riders, as in Bogotá, Jakarta and Santiago. BRT also needs enough local demand, so it works poorly in sprawling cities.

== Terminology ==
Bus rapid transit is a mode of mass rapid transit (MRT) and describes a high-capacity urban public-transit system with its own right of way, vehicles at short headways, platform-level boarding, and preticketing.

The expression "BRT" is mainly used in the Americas and China; in India, it is called "BRTS" (BRT System); in Europe it is often called a "busway" or a "BHLS" (stands for Bus with a High Level of Service). The term transitway was originated in 1981 with the opening of the OC Transpo transitway in Ottawa, Ontario, Canada.

Critics have charged that the term "bus rapid transit" has sometimes been misapplied to systems that lack most or all the essential features which differentiate it from conventional bus services. The term "bus rapid transit creep" has been used to describe severely degraded levels of bus service which fall far short of the BRT Standard promoted by the Institute for Transportation and Development Policy (ITDP) and other organizations.

== Reasons for use ==
Compared to other common transit modes such as light rail transit (LRT), bus rapid transit (BRT) service is attractive to transit authorities because it does not cost as much to establish and operate: no track needs to be laid, bus drivers typically require less training and less pay than rail operators, and bus maintenance is less complex than rail maintenance.

Moreover, buses are more flexible than rail vehicles, because a bus route can be altered, either temporarily or permanently, to meet changing demand or contend with adverse road conditions with comparatively little investment of resources.

== History ==
=== Background ===
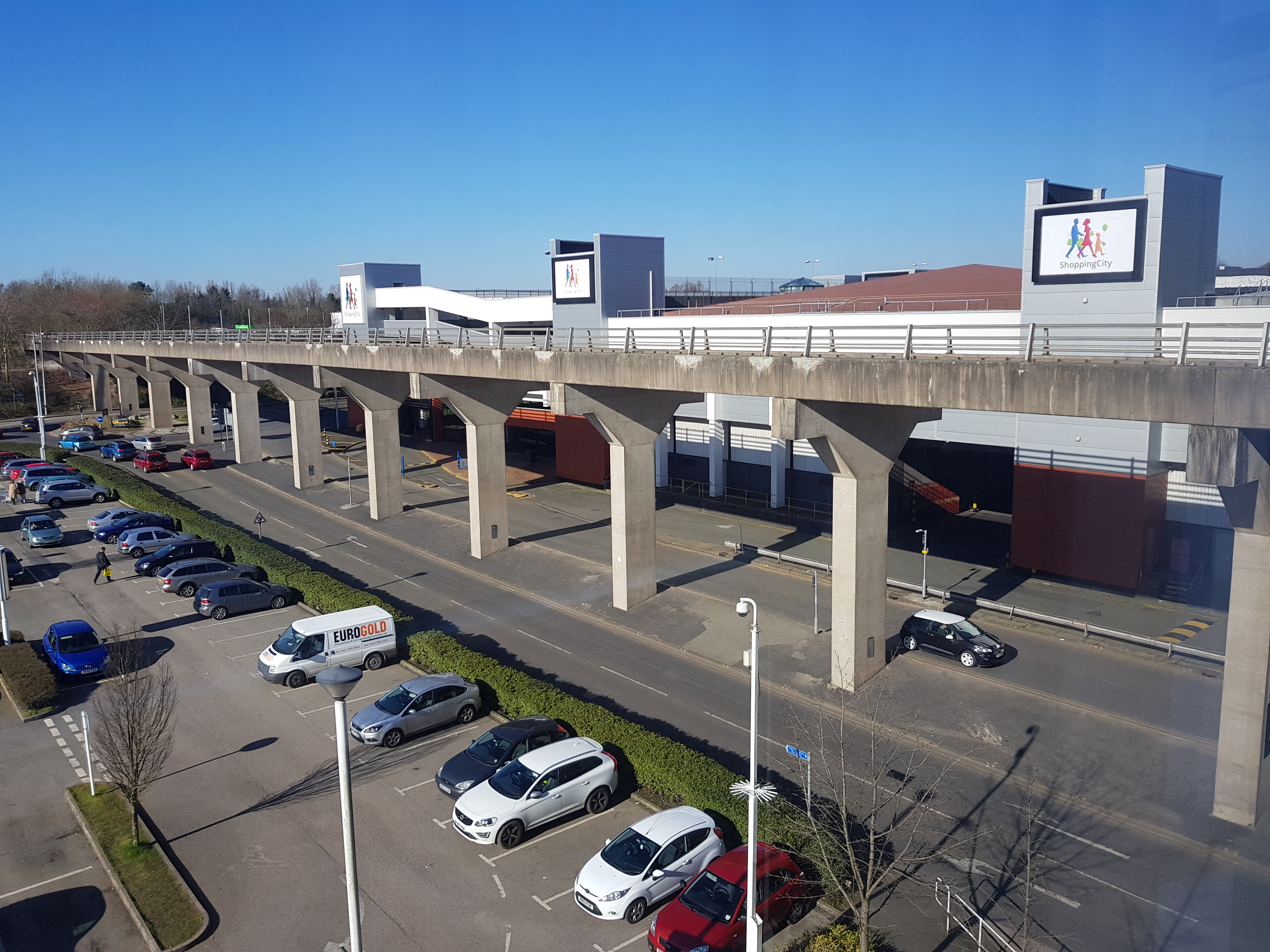
An elevated section of the Runcorn Busway

The first use of a protected busway was the East Side Trolley Tunnel in Providence, Rhode Island. It was converted from trolley to bus use in 1948. Another early bus system having some rapid transit features is the Runcorn Busway in Runcorn, England. First conceived in the Runcorn New Town Masterplan in 1966, it opened for services in October 1971 and all 22 kilometres (14 mi) were operational by 1980. The central station is at Runcorn Shopping City where buses arrive on dedicated raised busways to two enclosed stations. Arthur Ling, Runcorn Development Corporation's Master Planner, said that he had invented the concept while sketching on the back of an envelope. The town was designed around the transport system, with most residents no more than five minutes' walking distance, or 500 yards (460 m), from the Busway.

=== Brazil ===
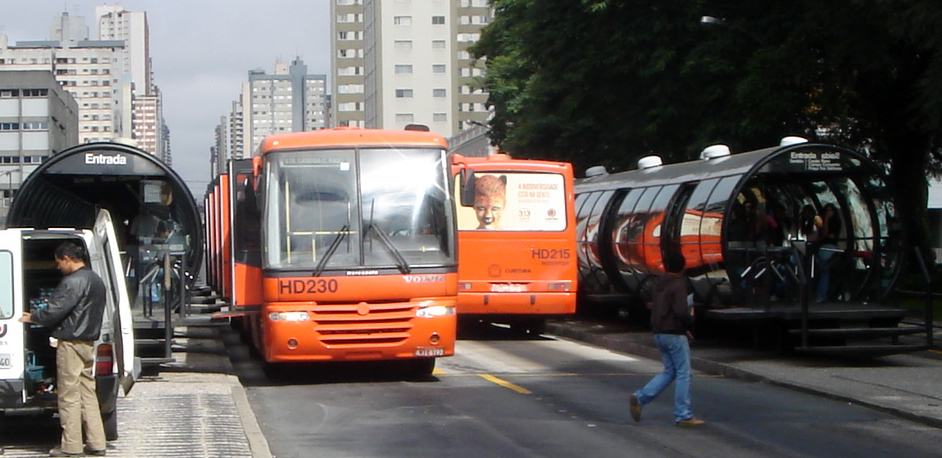
The RIT in Curitiba, was opened in 1974. The RIT was inspired by the National Urban Transport Company of Peru.

The first BRT system in the world was the Rede Integrada de Transporte (RIT, integrated transportation network), implemented in Curitiba, Brazil, in 1974. The Rede Integrada de Transporte was inspired by the previous transport system of the National Urban Transport Company of Peru (In Spanish: ENATRU), which only had quick access to Lima downtown, but it would not be considered BRT itself. Many of the elements that have become associated with BRT were innovations first suggested by Carlos Ceneviva, within the team of Curitiba Mayor Jaime Lerner. Initially just dedicated bus lanes in the center of major arterial roads, in 1980 the Curitiba system added a feeder bus network and inter-zone connections, and in 1992 introduced off-board fare collection, enclosed stations, and platform-level boarding. Other systems made further innovations, including platooning (three buses entering and leaving bus stops and traffic signals at once) in Porto Alegre, and passing lanes and express service in São Paulo.

=== Other early examples ===
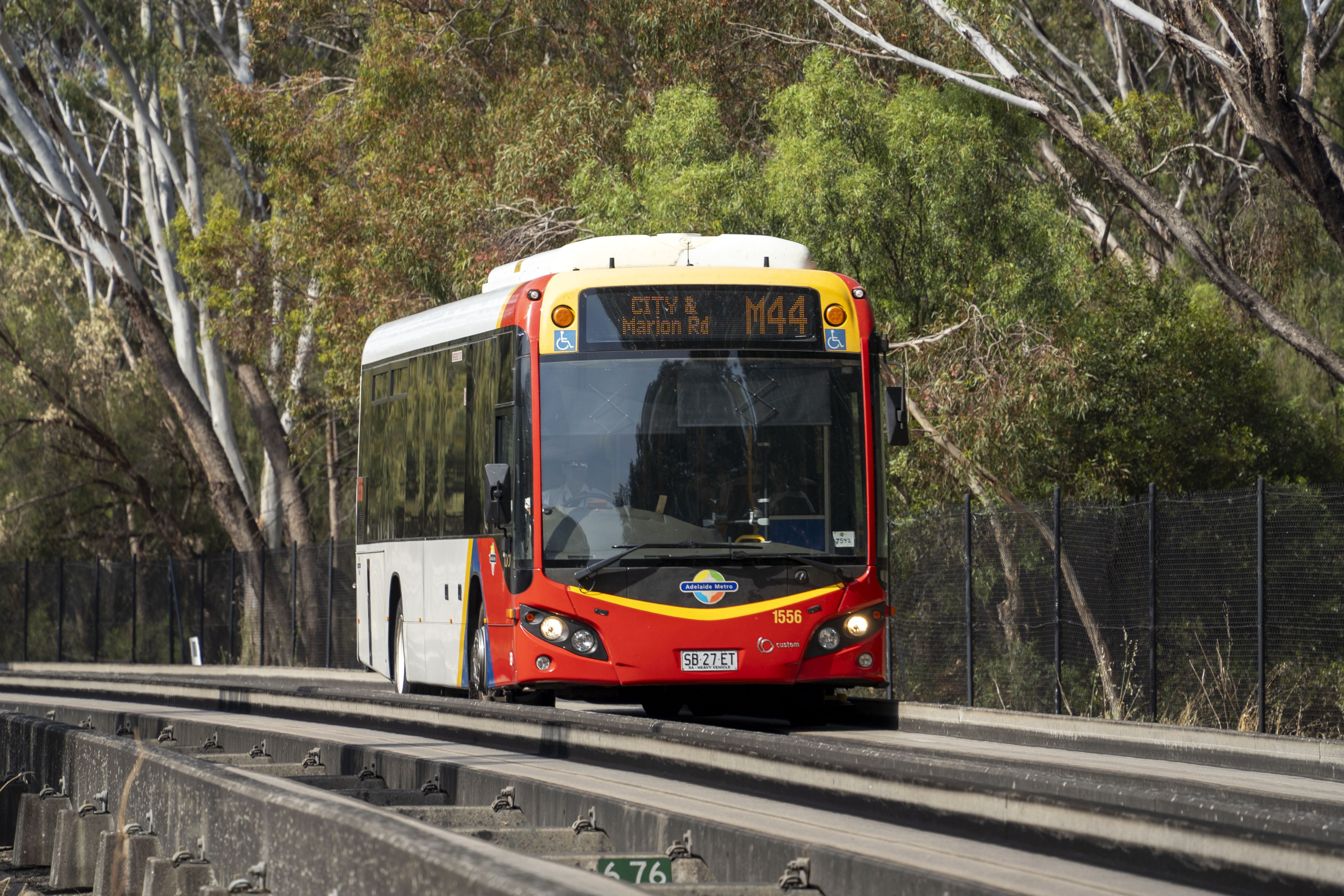
A Scania K280UB travelling on the O-Bahn in Adelaide, Australia

In the United States, an early prototype of BRT was the El Monte Busway, which opened in 1973. The 11 miles (18 km) long project occupied unused railroad right-of-way in the middle of the San Bernardino Freeway to add an exclusive bus lane which saved commuters 20-30 minutes in each direction, although the bus lane was opened to high occupancy vehicles in 1976. The El Monte Station terminal was called the "first bus rapid transit station in the world." Another pioneer in BRT was the Pittsburgh South Busway, operating on 4.3 miles (6.9 km) of exclusive lanes. Its success led to the Martin Luther King Jr. East Busway in 1983, a fuller BRT deployment including a dedicated busway of 9.1 miles (14.6 km), traffic signal preemption, and peak service headway as low as two minutes. After the opening of the West Busway, 5.1 miles (8.2 km) in length in 2000, Pittsburgh's Busway system is today over 18.5 miles long.

The OC Transpo BRT system in Ottawa, Canada, was introduced in 1983. The first element of its BRT system was dedicated bus lanes through the city centre, with platformed stops. The introduction of exclusive separate busways (termed 'Transitway') occurred in 1983. By 1996, all of the originally envisioned 31 km Transitway system was in operation; further expansions were opened in 2009, 2011, and 2014. As of 2019, the central part of the Transitway has been converted to light rail transit, due to the downtown section being operated beyond its designed capacity.

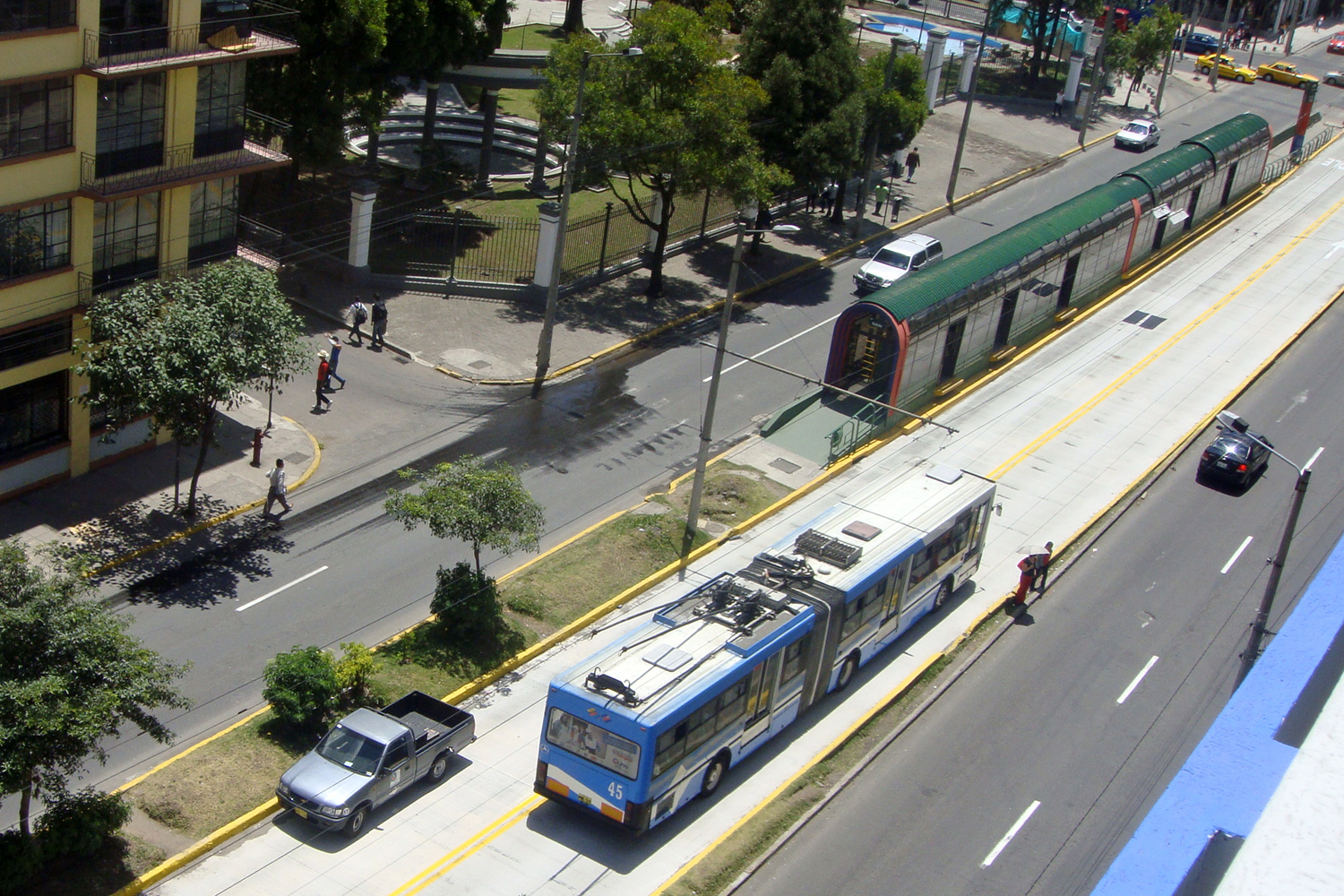
Trolleybus in Quito, Ecuador

In 1995, Quito, Ecuador, opened MetrobusQ its first BRT trolleybuses in Quito, using articulated trolleybuses.

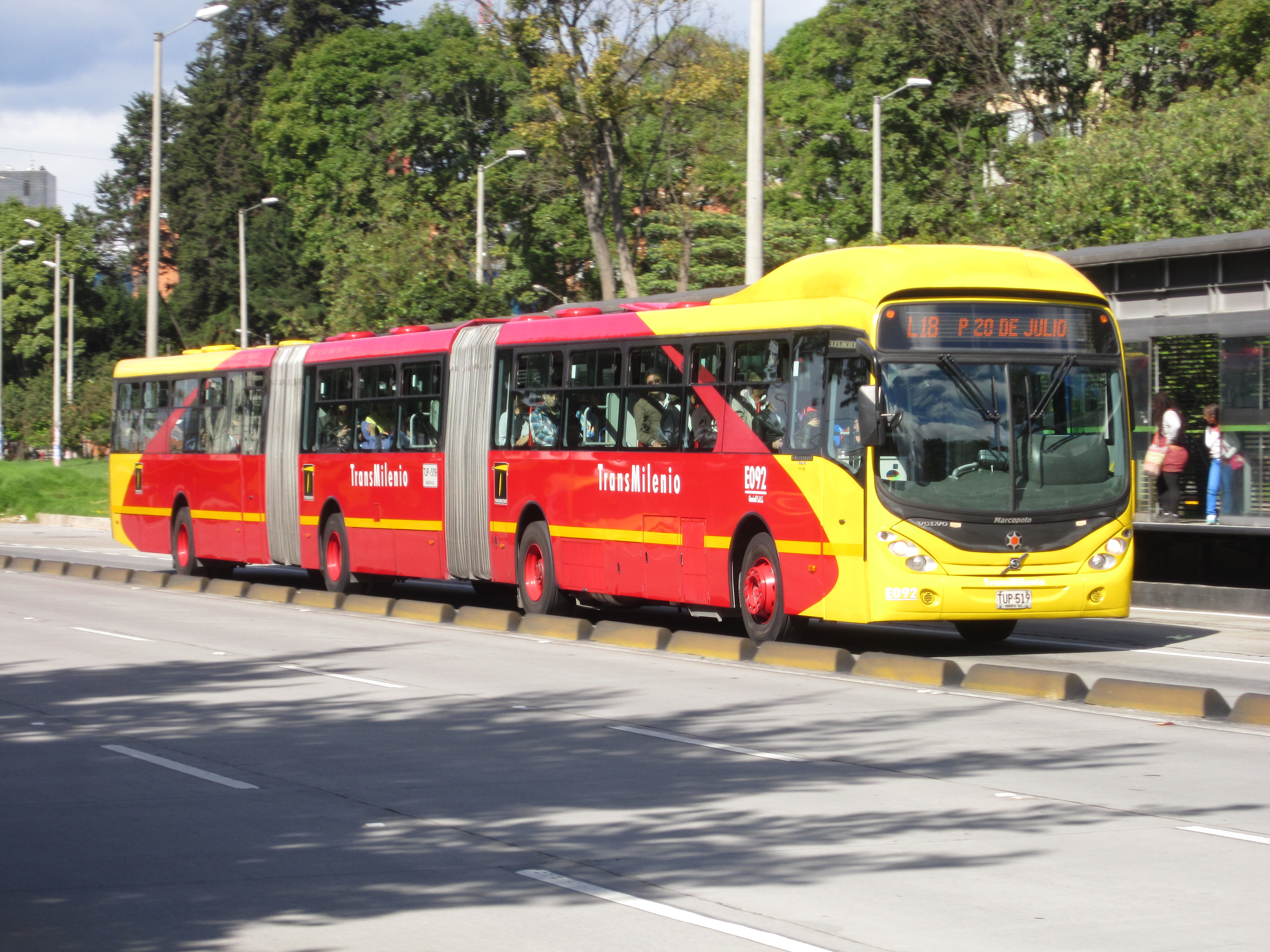
TransMilenio buses in Bogota, Colombia

The TransMilenio in Bogotá, Colombia, opening in 2000, was the first BRT system to combine the best elements of Curitiba's BRT with other BRT advances, and achieved the highest capacity and highest speed BRT system in the world.

In January 2004 the first BRT in Southeast Asia, Transjakarta, opened in Jakarta, Indonesia. As of 2015, at 210 kilometres (130 mi), it is the longest BRT system in the world.

Africa's first BRT system, the Lagos BRT, was opened in Lagos, Nigeria, in March 2008 but is considered a light BRT system by many people. Johannesburg, South Africa, BRT Rea Vaya, was the first true BRT in Africa, in August 2009, carrying 16,000 daily passengers. Rea Vaya and MIO (BRT in Cali, Colombia, opened 2009) were the first two systems to combine full BRT with some services that also operated in mixed traffic, then joined the BRT trunk infrastructure.

In 2017 Marrakesh, Morocco, opened its first BRT Marrakesh trolleybus system (BHNS De Marrakesh) trolleybuses Corridors of 8 km (5.0 mi), of which 3 km (1.9 mi) of overhead wiring for operation as trolleybus.

== Main features ==
BRT systems normally include most of the following features:

=== Dedicated lanes and alignment ===
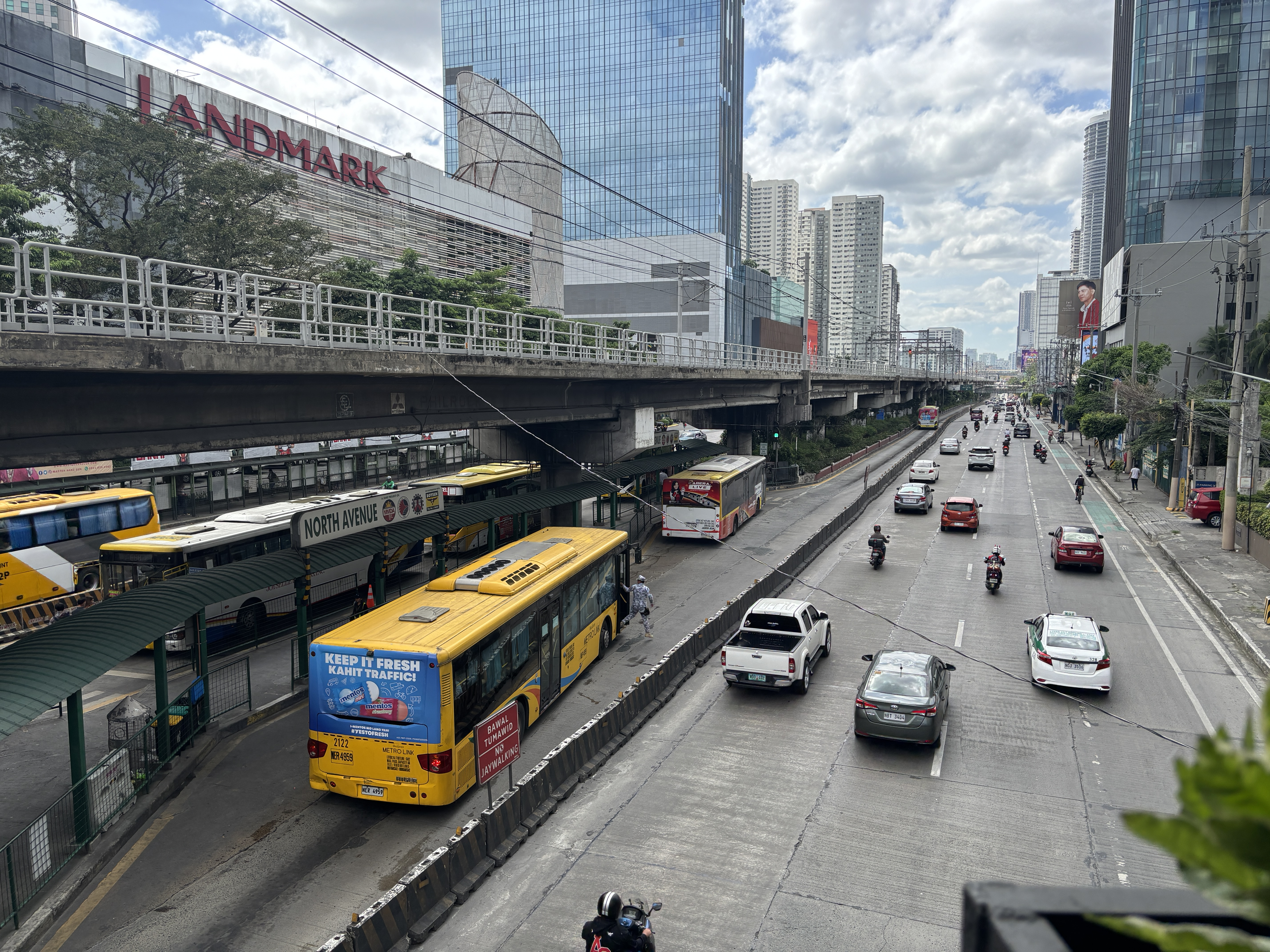
EDSA Carousel buses use separate lanes to avoid congested roads.

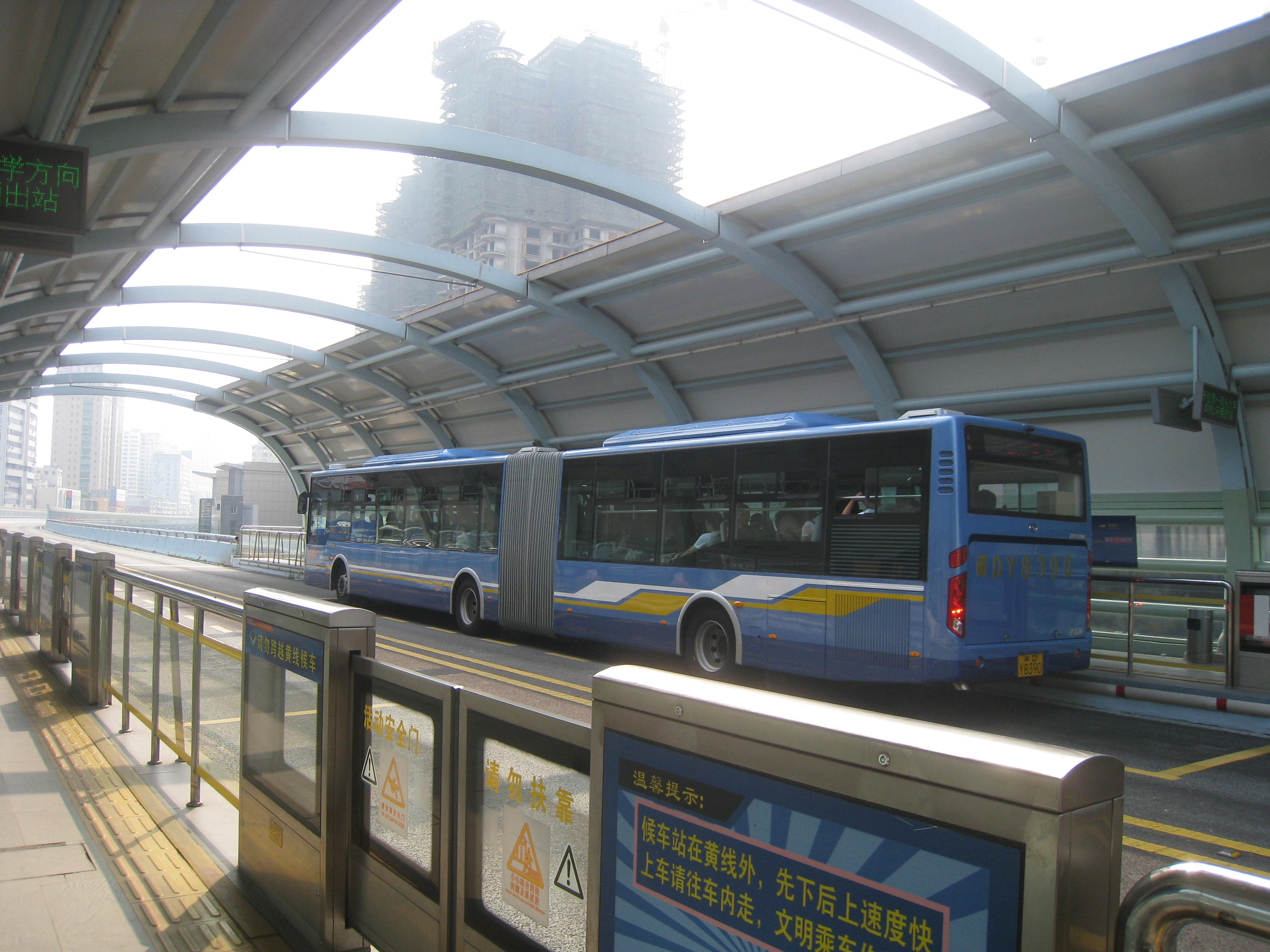
Elevated BRT system in Xiamen

Bus-only lanes make for faster travel and ensure that buses are not delayed by mixed traffic congestion. A median alignment bus-only keeps buses away from busy curb-side side conflicts, where cars and trucks are parking, standing and turning. Separate rights of way may be used such as the completely elevated EDSA Carousel, Transjakarta, and Xiamen BRT. Transit malls or 'bus streets' may also be created in city centers.

=== Off-board fare collection ===
Fare prepayment at the station, instead of on board the bus, eliminates the delay caused by passengers paying on board. Fare machines at stations also allow riders to purchase multi-ride stored-value cards and have multiple payment options. Prepayment also allows riders to board at all doors, further speeding up stops.

=== Bus priority, turning and standing restrictions ===
Prohibiting turns for traffic across the bus lane significantly reduces delays to the buses. Bus priority will often be provided at signalized intersections to reduce delays by extending the green phase or reducing the red phase in the required direction compared to the normal sequence. Prohibiting turns may be the most important measure for moving buses through intersections.

=== Platform-level boarding ===
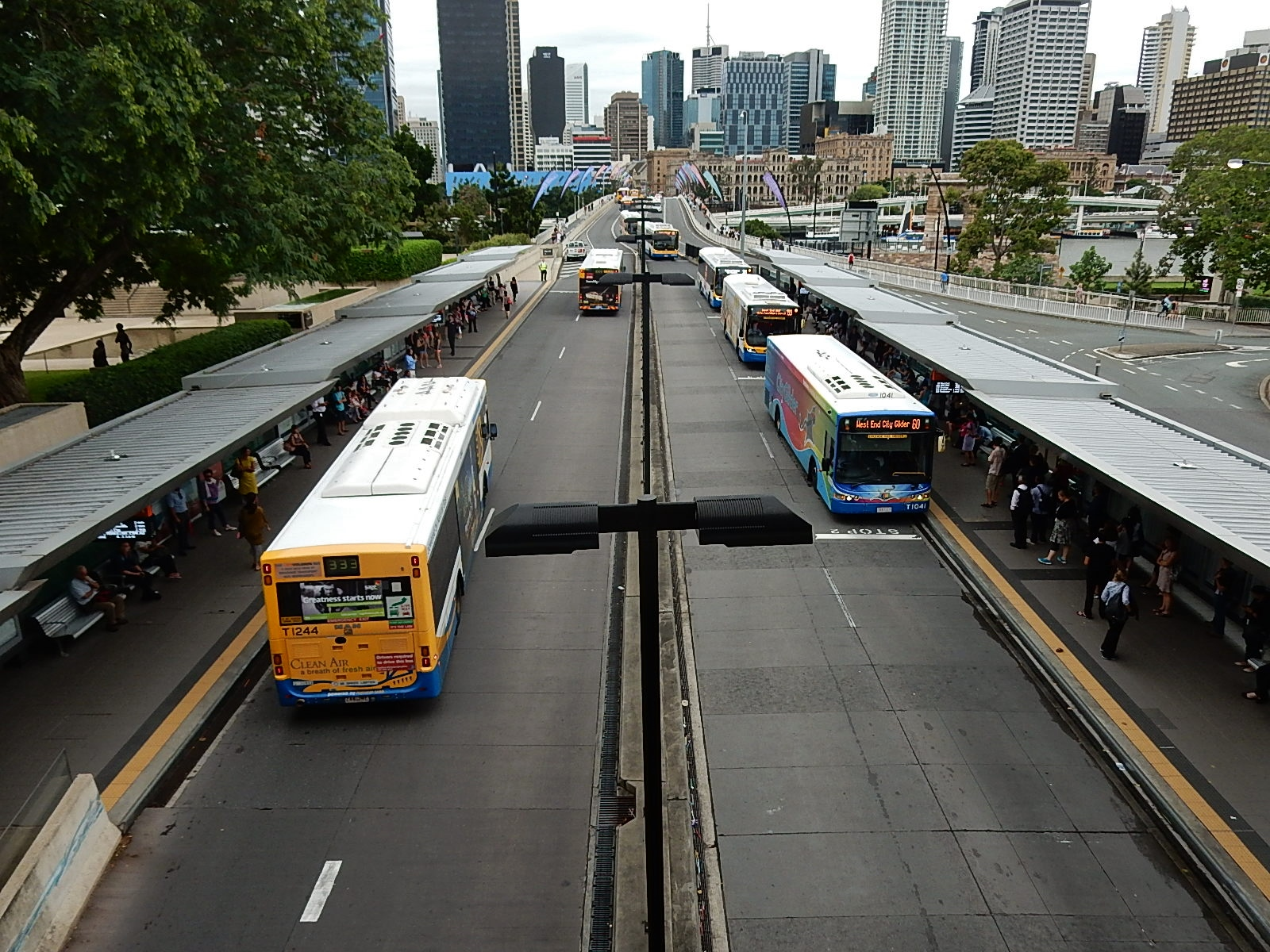
Cultural Centre busway station in Brisbane, Australia

The station platforms for BRT systems should be level with the bus floor for quick and easy boarding, making it fully accessible for wheelchairs, disabled passengers and baby strollers, with minimal delays.

High-level platforms for high-floored buses makes it difficult to have stops outside dedicated platforms, or to have conventional buses stop at high-level platforms, so these BRT stops are distinct from street-level bus stops. Similar to rail vehicles, there is a risk of a dangerous gap between bus and platform, and is even greater due to the nature of bus operations. Kassel curbs or other methods may be used to ease quick and safe alignment of the BRT vehicle with a platform.

A popular compromise is low-floor buses with a low step at the door, which can allow easy boarding at low-platform stops compatible with other buses. This intermediate design may be used with some low- or medium-capacity BRT systems.

The MIO system in Santiago de Cali, Colombia, pioneered in 2009 the use of dual buses, with doors on the left side of the bus that are located at the height of high-level platforms, and doors on the right side that are located at curb height. These buses can use the main line with its exclusive lanes and high level platforms, located on the center of the street and thus, boarding and leaving passengers on the left side. These buses can exit the main line and use normal lanes that share with other vehicles and stop at regular stations located on sidewalks on the right side of the street.

== Additional features ==
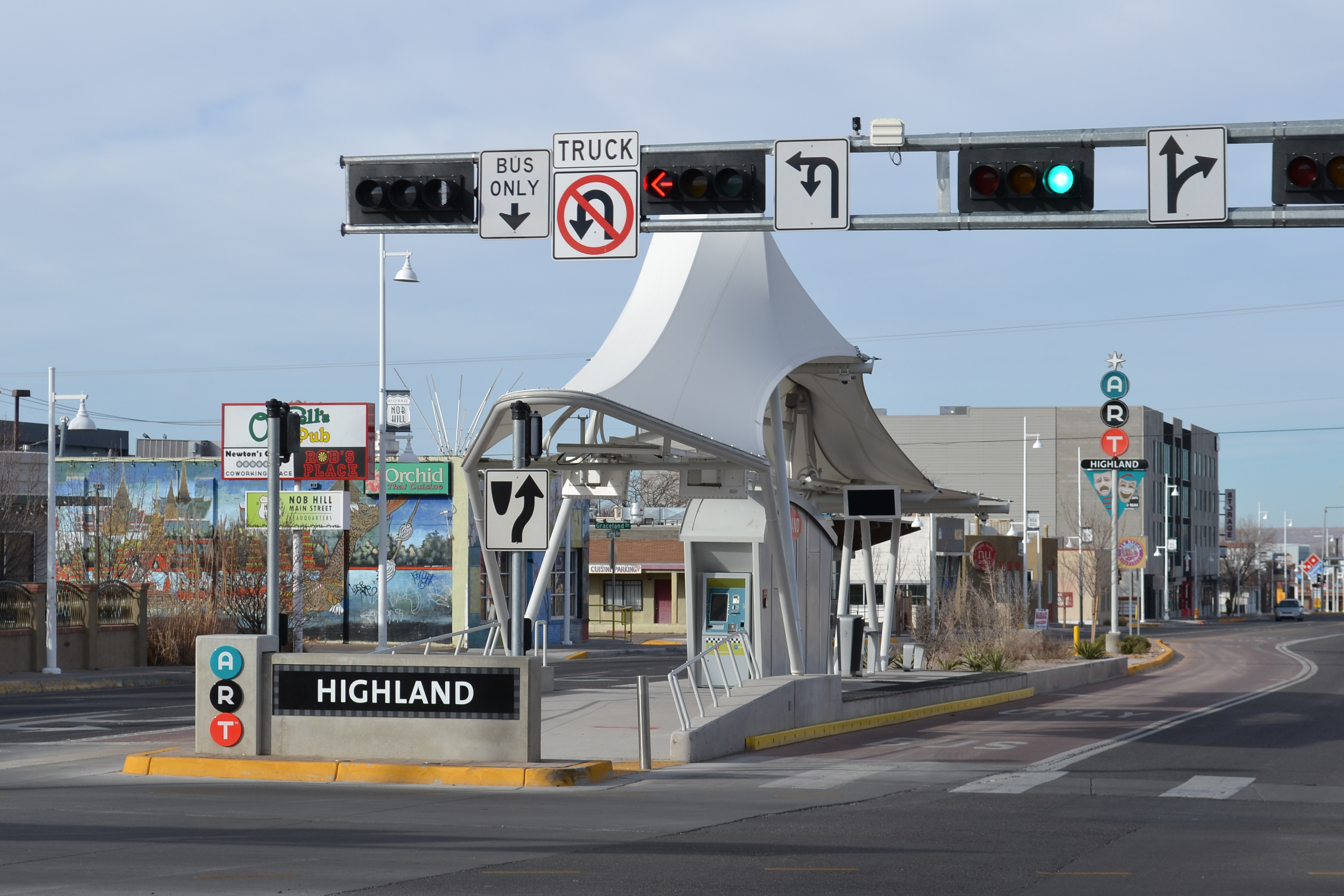
ART level-boarding station in the center of a public roadway with guideways on either side and a dedicated traffic signal in Albuquerque, New Mexico, United States

Groups of criteria form the BRT Standard 2016, which is updated by the Technical Committee of the BRT Standard.

=== High capacity vehicles ===
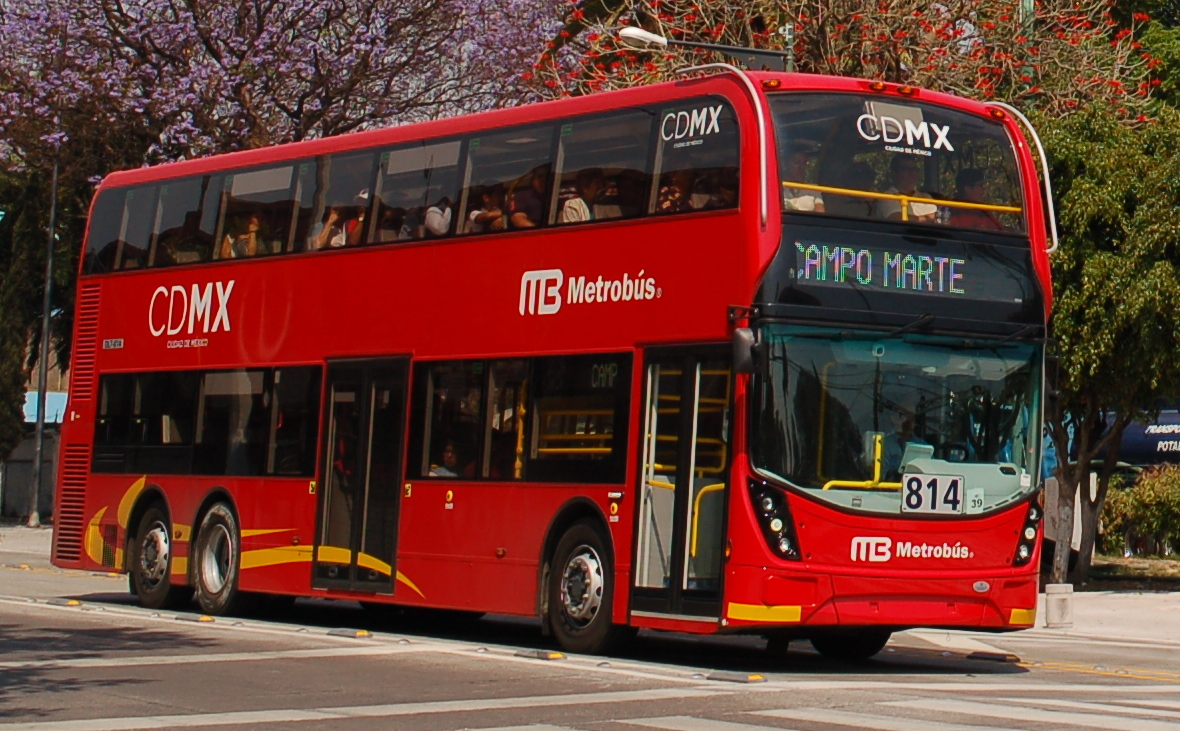
Double decker bus at Mexico City with capacity for 130 passengers

High-capacity vehicles such as articulated or even bi-articulated buses may be used, typically with multiple doors for fast entry and exit. Double-decker buses or guided buses may also be used. Advanced powertrain control may be used for a smoother ride.

=== Quality stations ===
Ticket barriers at the entrance to a MyCiTi station in Cape Town

Bottleneck BRT stations typically provide loading areas for simultaneous boarding and alighting of buses through multiple doors coordinated via displays and loudspeakers.

An example of high-quality stations include those used on TransMilenio in Bogotá since December 2000, the MIO in Cali since November 2008, Metrolinea in Bucaramanga since December 2009, Megabús in Pereira since May 2009. This design is also used in Johannesburg's Rea Vaya.

The term "station" is more flexibly applied in North America and ranges from enclosed waiting areas (Ottawa and Cleveland) to large open-sided shelters (Los Angeles and San Bernardino).

=== Prominent brand or identity ===
A unique and distinctive identity can contribute to BRT's attractiveness as an alternative to driving cars, (such as Viva, Max, TransMilenio, Metropolitano, Metronit, Select) marking stops and stations as well as the buses.

Public transit apps may feature services like trip planning, up-to-date line schedules, and advisories that may affect ridership. Freemium platforms such as Transit and Moovit apps are available in many cities around the world. Some operators of bus rapid transit systems have developed their own apps, like Transmilenio.

=== In tunnels or subterranean structures ===
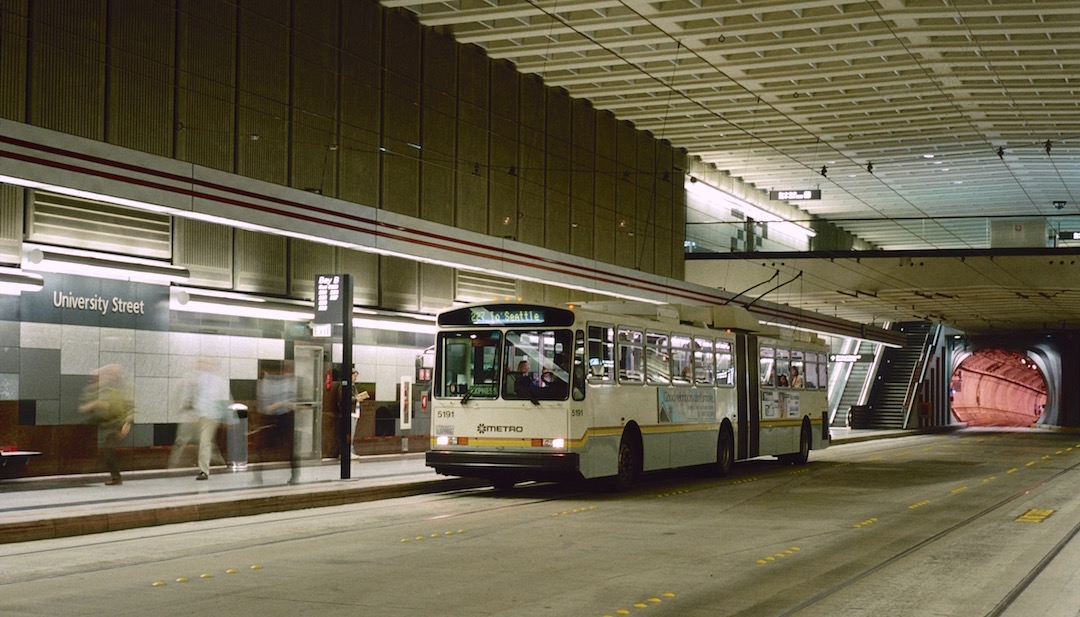
The Downtown Seattle Transit Tunnel used dual-mode buses from 1990 to 2004, which operated under electric power underground

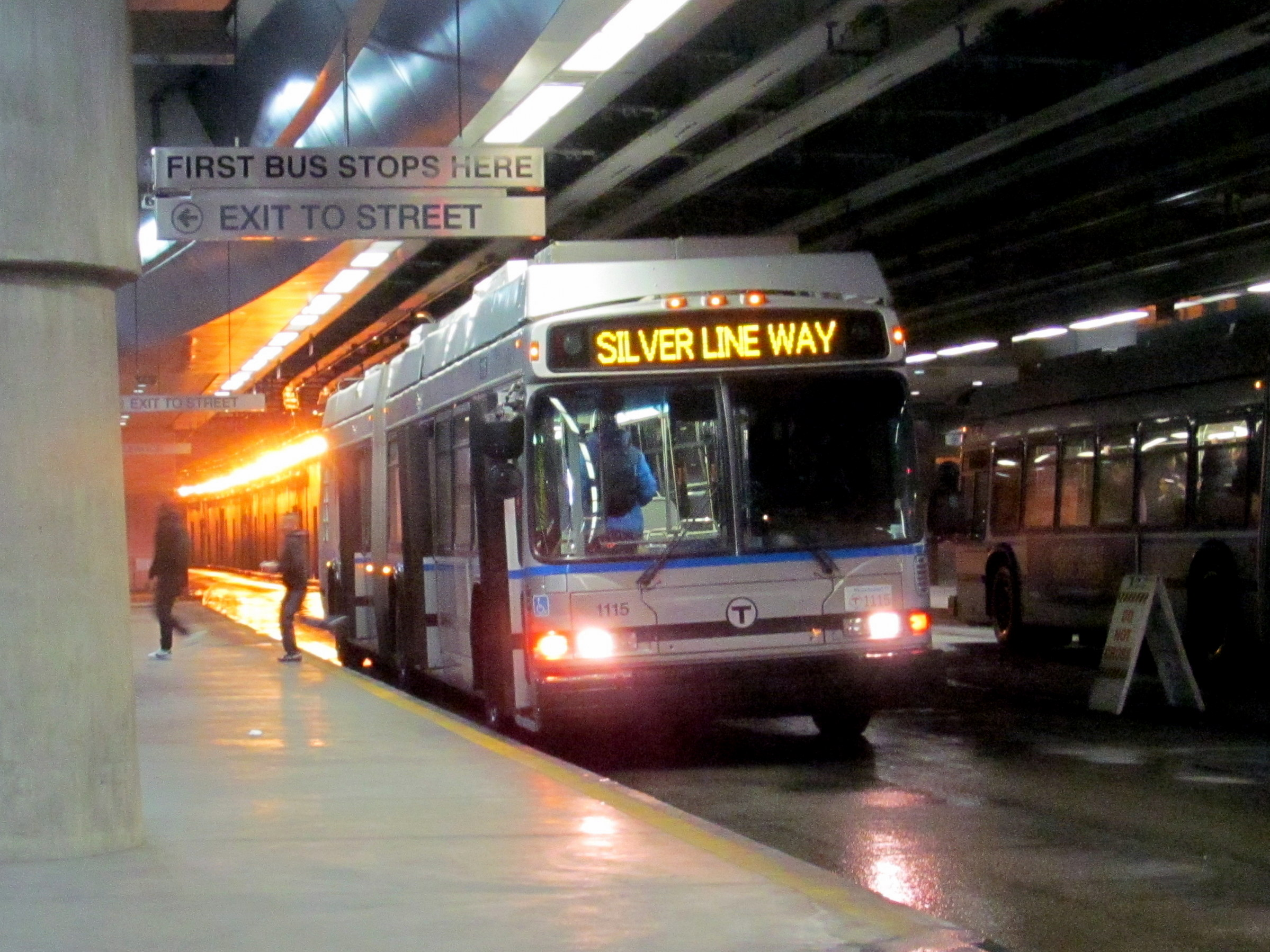
An outbound Silver Line bus at Courthouse station in Boston, Massachusetts

A special issue arises in the use of buses in metro transit structures. Since the areas where the demand for an exclusive bus right-of-way are apt to be in dense downtown areas where an above-ground structure may be unacceptable on historic, logistic, or environmental grounds, use of BRT in tunnels may not be avoidable.

Since buses are usually powered by internal combustion engines, bus metros raise ventilation issues similar to those of motor vehicle tunnels. Powerful fans typically exchange air through ventilation shafts to the surface; these are usually as remote as possible from occupied areas, to minimize the effects of noise and concentrated pollution.

An alternative is to use electric propulsion, which Seattle's Metro Bus Tunnel and Boston's Silver Line Phase II implemented. In Seattle, dual-mode (electric/diesel electric) buses manufactured by Breda were used until 2004, with the center axle driven by electric motors obtaining power from trolley wires through trolley poles in the subway, and with the rear axle driven by a conventional diesel powertrain on freeways and streets. Boston is using a similar approach, after initially using trolleybuses pending delivery of the dual-mode vehicles that was completed in 2005.

In 2004, Seattle replaced its "Transit Tunnel" fleet with diesel-electric hybrid buses, which operate similarly to hybrid cars outside the tunnel and in a low-noise, low-emissions "hush mode" (in which the diesel engine operates but does not exceed idle speed) when underground. The need to provide electric power in underground environments brings the capital and maintenance costs of such routes closer to those of light rail, and raises the question of building or eventually converting to light rail. In Seattle, the downtown transit tunnel was retrofitted for conversion to a shared hybrid-bus and light-rail facility in preparation for Seattle's Central Link Light Rail line, which opened in July 2009. In March 2019, expansion of the light rail in the tunnel moved buses back to surface streets.

Bi-articulated battery electric buses no longer cause problems in tunnels while still maintaining BRT capacity.

== Performance ==
A BRT system can be measured by a number of factors. The BRT Standard was developed by the Institute for Transportation and Development Policy (ITDP) to score BRT corridors, producing a list of rated BRT corridors meeting the minimum definition of BRT. The highest rated systems received a "gold" ranking. The latest edition of the standard was published in 2016.

Other metrics used to evaluate BRT performance include:

- The vehicle headway is the average time interval between vehicles on the same line. Buses can operate at headways of 15 seconds or less, but average headways on TransMilenio at busy intersections are 13 seconds, 14 seconds for the busiest section of the Metrobus (Istanbul) and 7 seconds in Belo Horizonte.
- Vehicle capacity, which can range from 50 passengers for a conventional bus up to some 300 for a bi-articulated vehicle or 500.
- The effectiveness of the stations to handle passenger demand. High volumes of passengers on vehicles require large bus stations and more boarding areas at busy interchange points. This is the standard bottleneck of BRT (and heavy rail).
- The effectiveness of the feeder system: can these deliver people to stations at the required speed?
- Local passenger demand. Without enough local demand for travel, the capacity will not be used.

Based on this data, the minimum headway and maximum current vehicle capacities, the theoretical maximum throughput measured in passengers per hour per direction (PPHPD) for a single traffic lane is some 150,000 passengers per hour (250 passengers per vehicle, one vehicle every 6 seconds). In real world conditions, TransMilenio Bogotá and Metrobus Istanbul perform 49,000 – 45,000 PPHPD, most other busy systems operating in the 15,000 to 25,000 range.

No.	Location	System name	Peak passengers per hour per direction	Passengers per day	Length (km)
1	Dar es Salaam	Dar es Salaam bus rapid transit	18,000	180,000 (-2,500,000)	21
2	Bogotá	TransMilenio	49,000	2,154,961	113
3	Ahmedabad	Janmarg (Ahmedabad BRT)		450,000	125
4	Guangzhou	Guangzhou Bus Rapid Transit	26,900	1,000,000	22
5	Cairo	Cairo Bus Rapid Transit			76
6	Curitiba	Rede Integrada de Transporte	13,900 – 24,100	508,000 (2,260,000 inc. feeder lines)	81
7	Mexico City	Mexico City Metrobus	18,500	1,800,000	140
8	Belo Horizonte	BRT Move	15,800 – 20,300	1,100,000	24
9	New Jersey	New Jersey BRT	15,500	62,000 (4-hour morning peak only)	
10	Brisbane	South East Busway	15,000	191,800	23
11	Jakarta	Transjakarta	1,935	1,300,000	264.6
12	New York	Select Bus Service		30,195	
13	Tehran	Tehran Bus Rapid Transit		1,800,000	150
14	Lahore Metrobus	Lahore Transport Company		220,000	29

Research of the Institute for Transportation and Development Policy (ITDP) shows a capacity ranking of MRT modes, based on reported performance of 14 light rail systems, 14 heavy rail systems (just 1-track + 3 2-track-systems "highest capacity") and 56 BRT systems.

The study concludes, that BRT-"capacity on TransMilenio exceeds all but the highest capacity heavy rail systems, and it far exceeds the highest light rail system."

Performance data of 84 systems show

1. 37,700 passengers in peak hour per direction (PPHPD) in the best BRT system
2. 36,000 in the best 1-track-heavy rail system
3. 13,400 in the best light rail system

=== Comparison with light rail ===
After the first BRT system opened in 1971, cities were slow to adopt BRT because they believed that the capacity of BRT was limited to about 12,000 passengers per hour traveling in a given direction during peak demand. While this is a capacity rarely needed in the US (12,000 is more typical as a total daily ridership), in the developing world this capacity constraint (or rumor of a capacity constraint) was a significant argument in favor of heavy rail metro investments in some venues.

When TransMilenio opened in 2000, it changed the paradigm by giving buses a passing lane at each station stop and introducing express services within the BRT infrastructure. These innovations increased the maximum achieved capacity of a BRT system to 35,000 passengers per hour. Light rail, by comparison, has reported passenger capacities between 3,500 pph (mainly street running) to 19,000 pph (fully grade-separated).

There are conditions that favor light rail over BRT, but they are fairly narrow. These conditions are a corridor with only one available lane in each direction, more than 16,000 passengers per direction per hour but less than 20,000, and a long block length, because the train cannot block intersections. These conditions are rare, but in that specific instance, light rail might have a minimal operational advantage.

The United States Government Accountability Office (U.S. GAO) summarized in the report "Mass Transit – Bus Rapid Transit Shows Promise", the U.S. Federal Transit Administration (FTA) provided funding for the construction of heavy rail and of light rail at that time, but not of BRT. The FTA funding of BRT "rather focuses on obtaining and sharing information on projects being pursued by local transit agencies". In spite of this different funding the capital costs of BRT systems were lower in many US communities than those of light rail systems and performance often similar. The GAO stated, BRT systems were generally more flexible compared to light rail and faster. "While transit officials noted a public bias toward Light Rail, research has found that riders have no preference for rail over bus when service characteristics are equal."

=== Comparison with heavy rail ===
Fjellstrom/Wright distributed a map of the mid-term goal to expand Bogota's BRT system, TransMilenio, so that 85% of the city's 7 million inhabitants live within 500m distance to a TransMilenio line. Such an expansion program would be unrealistic for a rail-based MRT-system, according to Bogota's mayor.

An additional use of BRT is the replacement of heavy rail services, due to infrastructure damage, reduced ridership, or a combination of both where lower maintenance costs are desired while taking advantage of an existing dedicated right of way. One such system in Japan consists of portions of the JR East Kesennuma and Ōfunato Lines, which were catastrophically damaged during the 2011 Tōhoku earthquake and tsunami, and later repaired as a bus lane over the same right of way, providing improved service with much lower restoration and maintenance costs. Another system set to open in August 2023 is a portion of the JR Kyushu Hitahikosan Line, which was damaged due to torrential rain in 2017. In both cases, ridership had dropped considerably since the lines opened, and the higher capacity of a rail line is no longer needed or cost-effective compared to buses on the same alignments.

=== Comparison with conventional bus services ===
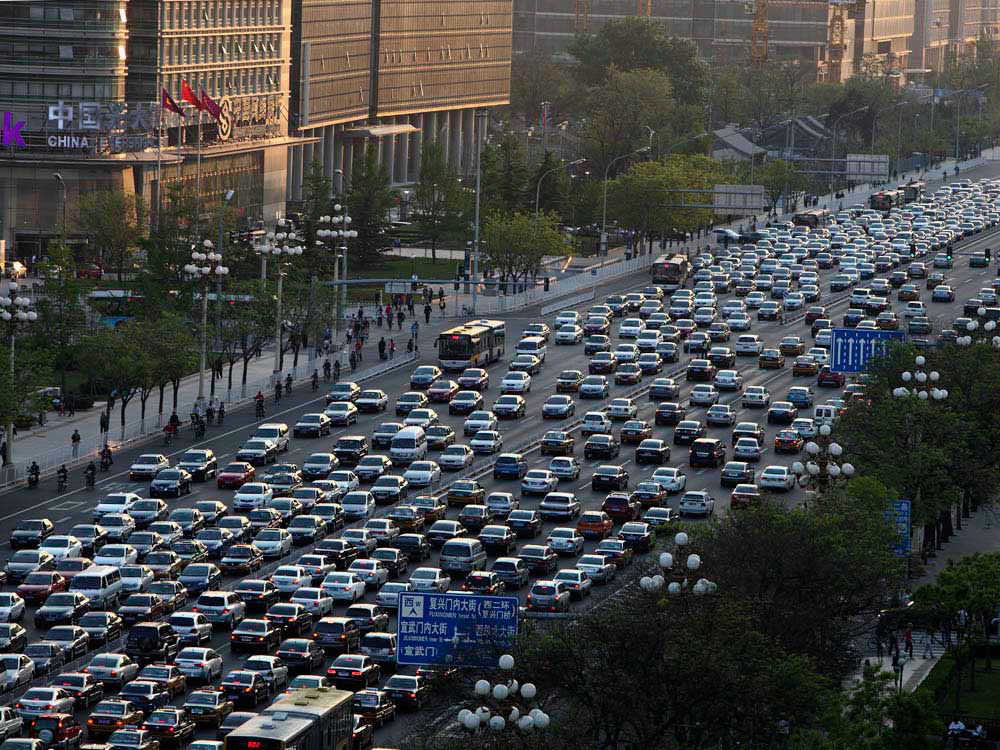
Conventional bus services being delayed by traffic congestion on Chang'an Avenue in Beijing

Conventional scheduled bus services use general traffic lanes, which can be slow due to traffic congestion, and the speed of bus services is further reduced by long dwell times.

In 2013, the New York City authorities noted that buses on 34th Street, which carried 33,000 bus riders a day on local and express routes, traveled at 4.5 miles per hour (7.2 km/h), only slightly faster than walking pace. Even despite the implementation of Select Bus Service (New York City's version of a bus rapid transit system), dedicated bus lanes, and traffic cameras on the 34th Street corridor, buses on the corridor were still found to travel at an average of 4.5 mph.

In the 1960s, Reuben Smeed predicted that the average speed of traffic in central London would be 9 miles per hour (14 km/h) without other disincentives such as road pricing, based on the theory that this was the minimum speed that people will tolerate. When the London congestion charge was introduced in 2003, the average traffic speed was indeed 14 kilometres per hour (8.7 mph) which was the highest speed since the 1970s. By way of contrast, typical speeds of BRT systems range from 17 to 30 miles per hour (27 to 48 km/h).

== Cost ==
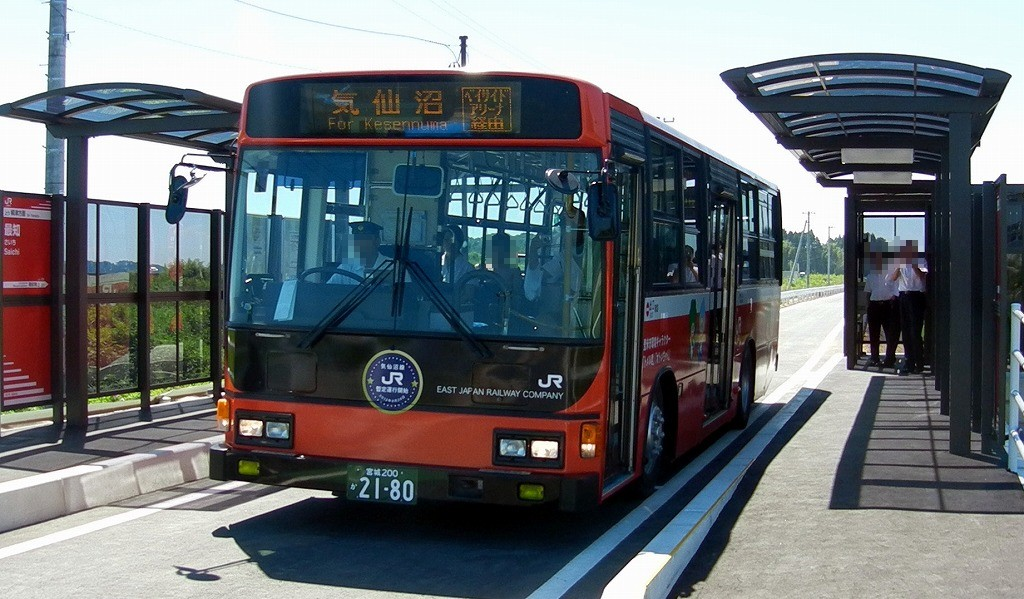
The Kesennuma Line in Japan was damaged in the 2011 tsunami. JR converted sections of the line into a dedicated bus rapid transit (BRT) route due to the cost of reconstructing the railway.

The capital cost of implementing BRT is lower than for light rail: A study by the U.S. Government Accountability Office (GAO) from 2000 found that the average capital cost per mile for busways was $13.5 million while light rail average cost was $34.8 million. The total investment varies considerably due to factors such as cost of the roadway, amount of grade separation, station structures and traffic signal systems.

In 2003, a study edited by the German GTZ compared various MRT systems all over the world and concluded ″Bus Rapid Transit (BRT) can provide high-quality, metro-like transit service at a fraction of the cost of other options″.

In 2013, the analysis of a database of nineteen LRT projects, twenty-six HRT projects, and forty-two BRT projects specified "In higher income countries ... an HRT alternative is likely to cost up to 40 times as much as a BRT alternative". and a surface LRT alternative about 4 times that of a BRT alternative.

In the study done by the U.S. GAO, BRT systems usually had lower cost as well based on "operating cost per vehicle hour", as on "operating cost per revenue mile", and on "operating cost per passenger trip", mainly because of lower vehicle cost and lower infrastructure cost.

As long as most buses still run on diesel, air quality can become a significant concern in tunnels, but the Downtown Seattle Transit Tunnel is an example of using hybrid buses, which switch to overhead electric propulsion while they are underground, eliminating diesel emissions and reducing fuel usage. Alternatives are elevated busways or - more expensive - elevated railways.

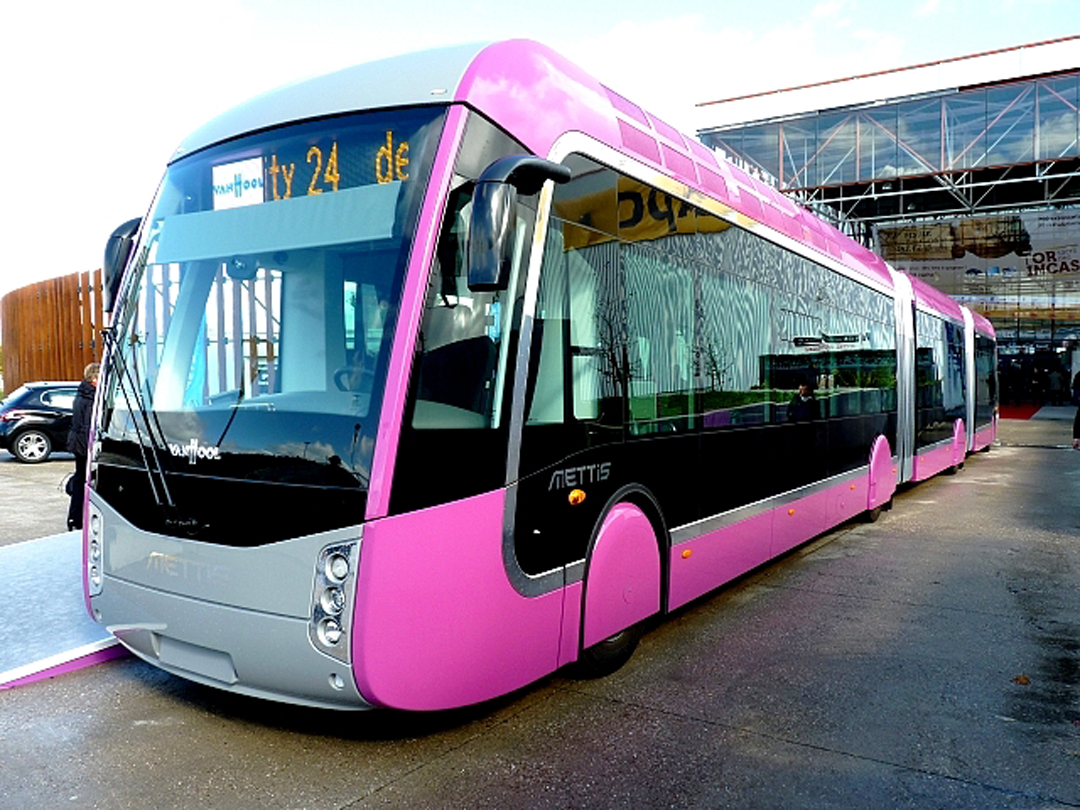
Prominent articulated "tram-like" Van Hool vehicles are used in Metz, France.

== Criticism ==
BRT systems have been widely promoted by non-governmental organizations such as the Shell-funded EMBARQ program, Rockefeller Foundation and Institute for Transportation and Development Policy (ITDP), whose consultant pool includes the former mayor of Bogota (Colombia), Enrique Peñalosa (former president of ITDP).

Supported by contributions of bus-producing companies such as Volvo, the ITDP not only established a proposed "standard" for BRT system implementation, but developed intensive lobby activities around the world to convince local governments to select BRT systems over rail-based transportation models (subways, light trains, etc.).

=== Standards non-compliance ===
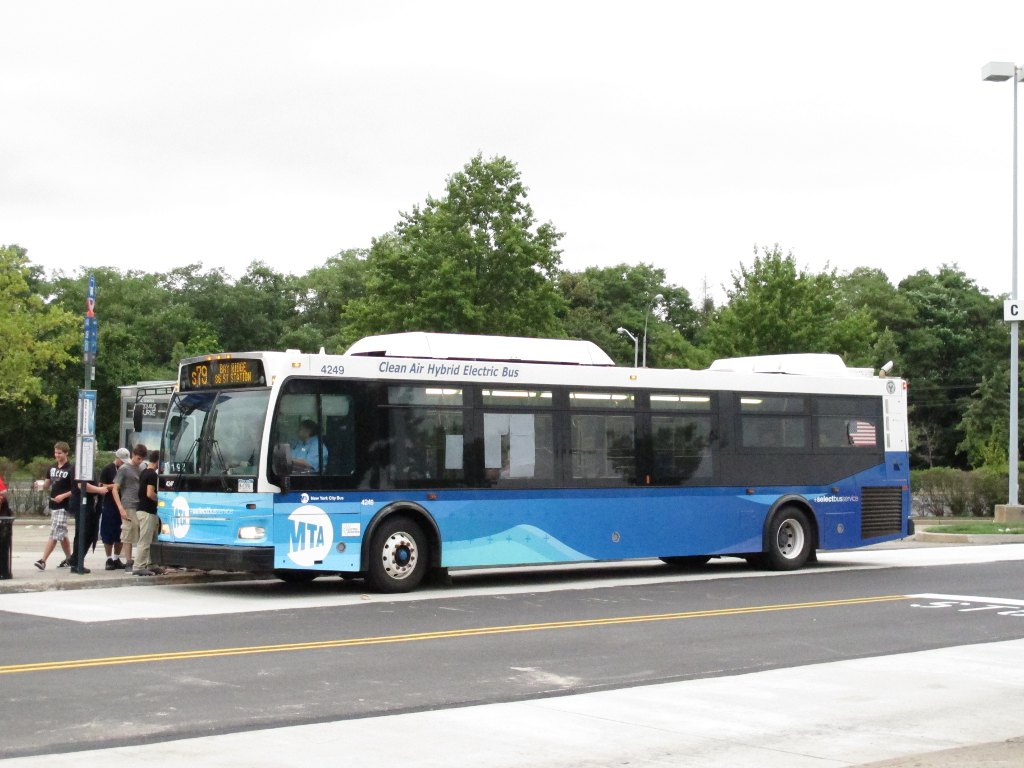
S79 SBS bus at Staten Island Mall. The degradation of Select Bus Service (SBS) in New York City is cited as an example of not meeting ITDP standards.

The ITDP has also developed the BRT Standard survey, a framework for evaluating BRT systems based on features such as dedicated lanes, station design, and off-board fare collection.

=== Environmental issues ===
Unlike electric-powered trains commonly used in rapid transit and light rail systems, bus rapid transit often uses diesel- or gasoline-fueled engines. The typical bus diesel engine causes noticeable levels of air pollution, noise and vibration. It is noted however that BRT can still provide significant environmental benefits over private cars. In addition, BRT systems can replace an inefficient conventional bus network for more efficient, faster and less polluting BRT buses. For example, Bogotá previously used 2,700 conventional buses providing transportation to 1.6 million passengers daily, while in 2013 TransMilenio transported 1.9 million passengers using only 630 BRT buses, a fleet less than a quarter in size of the old fleet, that circulates at twice the speed, with a huge reduction in air pollution.

To reduce direct emissions some systems use alternative forms of traction such as electric or hybrid engines. BRT systems can use trolleybuses to lower air pollution and noise emissions such as those in Beijing and Quito. The price penalty of installing overhead lines could be offset by the environmental benefits and potential for savings from centrally generated electricity, especially in cities where electricity is less expensive than other fuel sources. Trolleybus electrical systems can be potentially reused for future light rail conversion. Transjakarta buses use cleaner compressed natural gas-fueled engines, while Bogotá started to use hybrid buses in 2012; these hybrid systems use regenerative braking to charge batteries when the bus stops and then use electric motors to propel the bus up to 40 km/h, then automatically switching to the diesel engine for higher speeds, which allows for considerable savings in fuel consumption and pollutant dispersion.

=== Overcrowding and poor quality service ===
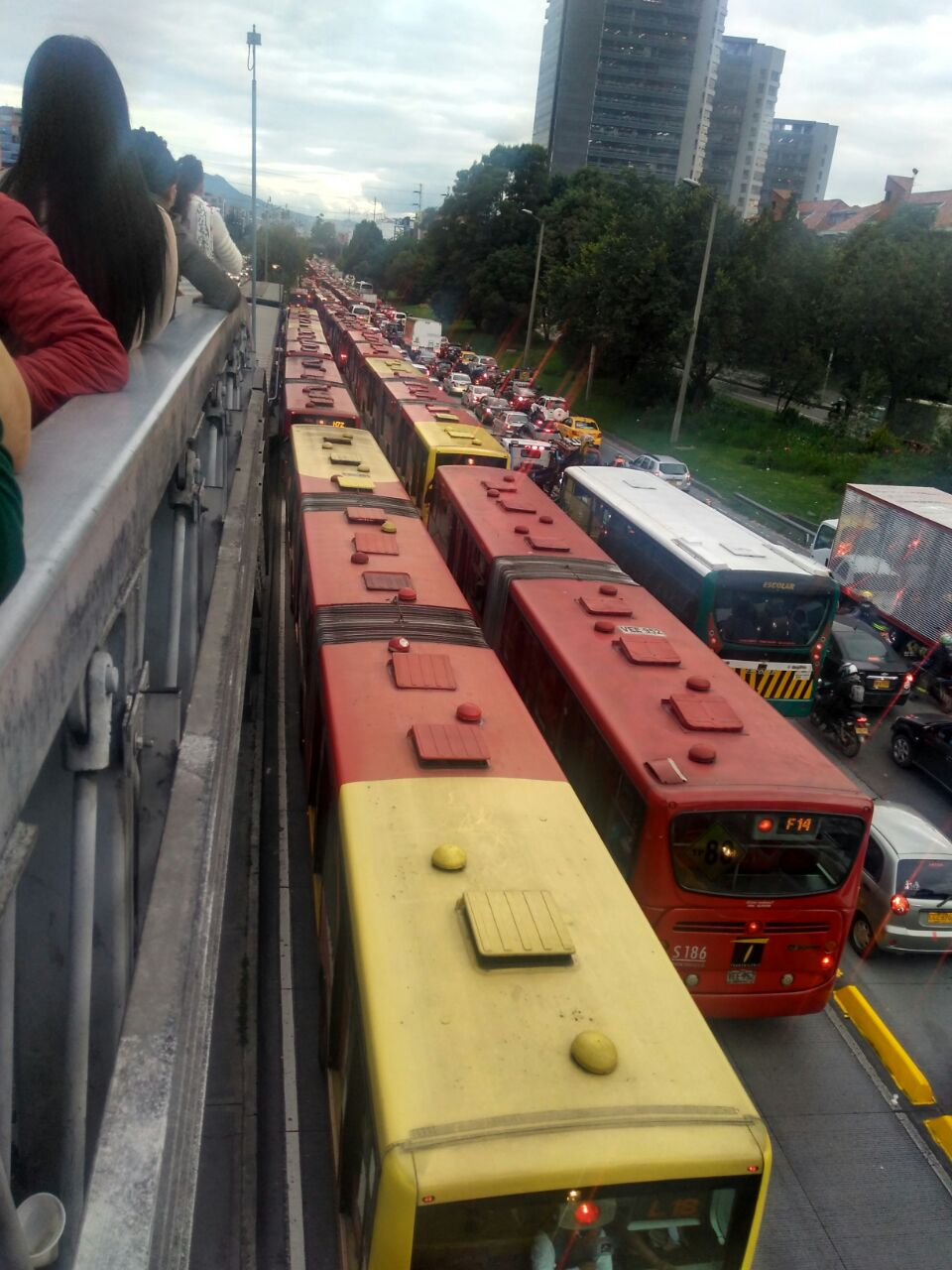
Traffic jam at TransMilenio's dedicated line

Many BRT systems suffer from overcrowding in buses and stations as well as long wait times for buses. In Santiago de Chile, the average of the system is six passengers per square meter (5/sq yd) inside vehicles. Users have reported days where the buses take too long to arrive, and are too overcrowded to accept new passengers. As of June 2017, the system has an approval rating of 15% among commuters, and it has lost 27% of its passengers, who have turned mostly to cars.

In Bogotá the overcrowding was even worse; the average of TransMilenio was eight passengers per square meter (7/sq yd). Only 29% felt satisfied with the system. The data also showed that 23% of the citizens agreed with building more TransMilenio lines, in contrast of the 42% who considered that a rapid transit system should be built. Several cases of sexual assault had been reported by female users in TransMilenio. According to a 2012 survey made by the secretary of the woman of Bogota, 64% of women said they had been victims of sexual assault in the system. The system had even been ranked as the most dangerous transportation for women. The poor quality of the system had occasioned an increment in the number of cars and motorcycles in the city; citizens preferred these transportation means over TransMilenio. According to official data, the number of cars increased from approximately 666,000 in 2005 to 1,586,700 in 2016. The number of motorcycles was also growing, with 660,000 sold in Bogota in 2013, two times the number of cars sold.

At the end of 2018 Transmilenio ordered 1383 new buses as a replacement of the older ones in service. 52% were compressed natural gas (CNG) buses made by Scania with Euro 6 emission rating, 48% were diesel engine made by Volvo with Euro 5 emission rating. More (or renewed?) orders have produced an impressive result: "To improve public and environmental health, the City of Bogotá has assembled a fleet of 1,485 electric buses for its public transportation system - placing the city among the three largest e-bus fleets outside of China."

In the year 2022 Bogotá has won the Sustainable Transport Award, an award given out by the Institute for Transportation and Development Policy, which is partially funded by bus manufacturers. Reasons stated include the TransMilenio system and its urban cycling strategy.

The system in Jakarta had been experiencing issues, with complaints of overcrowding in buses and stations and low frequency of the routes. There were extensive safety concerns as well; rampant sexual harassment has been reported, and the fire safety of the buses has been under scrutiny after one of the buses, a Zhongtong imported from China, suddenly and spontaneously caught on fire. The quality of the service was so bad that the then-governor of Jakarta, Basuki Tjahaja Purnama, in March 2015 publicly apologized for the poor performance of the system.

=== Failures and reversals ===
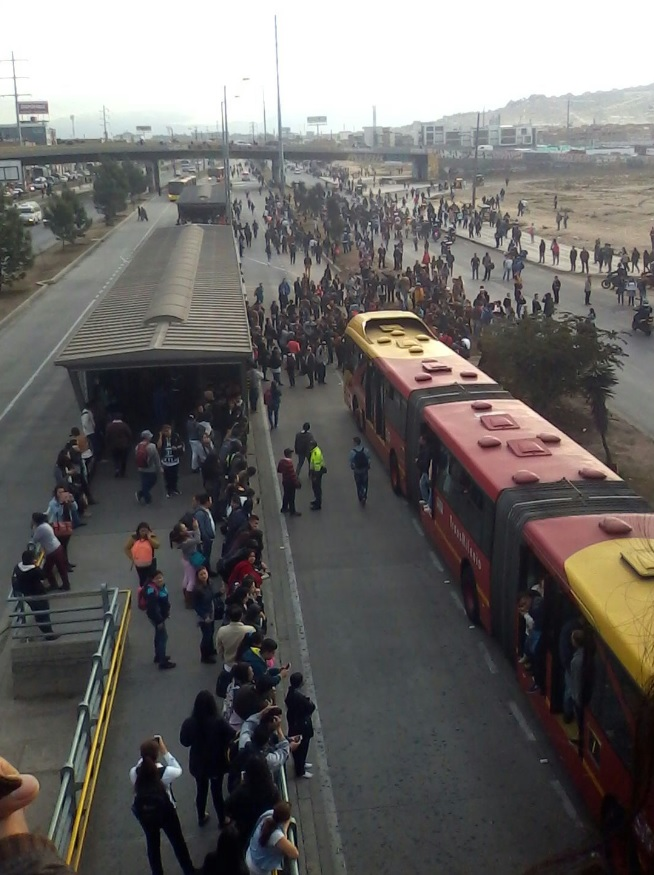
Protests in TransMilenio at the Terreros station, 12 February 2016

The temporary unpopularity of Delhi's BRT (2016) and the riots and spontaneous user demonstrations in Bogotá (2016) raised doubts about the ability of BRTs to keep pace with increased ridership. On the other hand the speed of increased BRT ridership confirmed the research finding no general preference for rail over bus. Bogota has regained trust and safety according to the Sustainable Transport Award 2022.

A lack of permanence of BRT has been criticized, with some arguing that BRT systems can be used as an excuse to build roads that others later try to convert for use by non-BRT vehicles. Examples of this can be found in Delhi, where a BRT system was scrapped, and in Aspen, Colorado, where drivers are lobbying the government to allow mixed-use traffic in former BRT lanes as of 2017, although in other US cities, such as Albuquerque, New Mexico, just the opposite is true. Such excuse might be a side effect of the advantages connected with the flexibility of BRT.

Experts have considered a failure of BRT to land use structure. Some cities that are sprawled and have no mixed use have insufficient ridership to make BRT economically viable. In Africa, the African Urban Institute criticized the viability of ongoing BRTs across the continent.

== Impact ==
A 2018 study found that the introduction of a BRT network in Mexico City reduced air pollution, as measured by emissions of CO, NOX, and PM10.

== See also ==
- Autonomous Rapid Transit
- Bus lane
- BRT Standard
- Capacitor electric vehicle
- List of bus rapid transit systems
- List of bus operating companies
- List of guided busways and BRT systems in the United Kingdom
- List of trolleybus systems
- Park and ride
- Quality Bus Corridor
- Queue jump
- Sustainable transport
- Traffic engineering (transportation)
- Transit bus
- Transit Elevated Bus
