= List of bus rapid transit systems in South America =

The term bus rapid transit system (BRT system) has been applied to a wide range of bus, trolleybus, and electric bus systems. In 2012, the Institute for Transportation and Development Policy (ITDP) published a BRT Standard to make it easier to standardize and compare bus services.

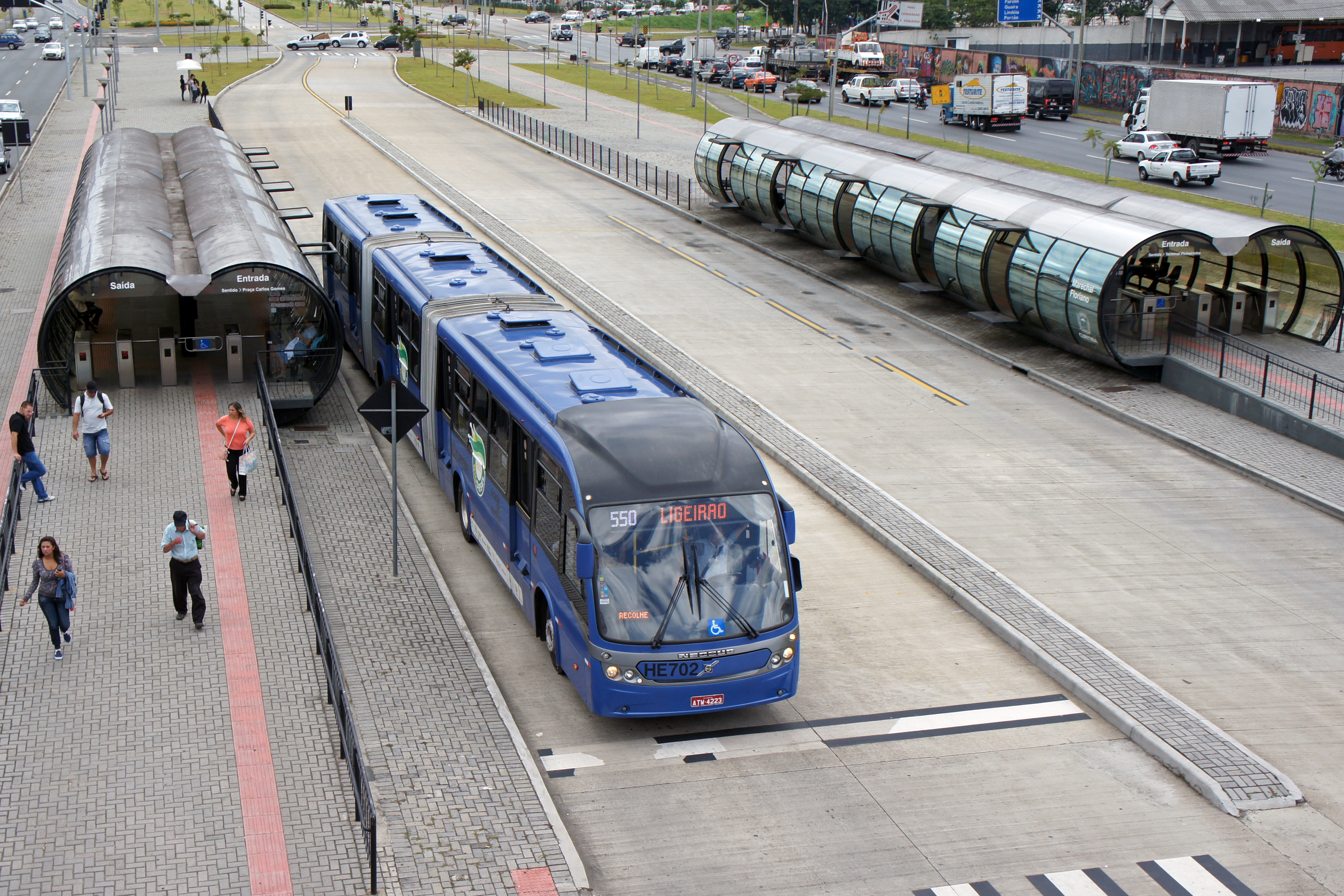
Marechal Floriano BRT station on Curitiba's RIT Green Line (Linha Verde)

The below list only includes BRT systems in South America that are in operation or under construction.

== Legend ==
Status (background color)

- White: Operational
- Light blue: Under construction

City
Primary city served by the buses and trolleybus.
System name
The English name of the bus rapid transit or overview article for city.
Operator
Operating the main bus services along its designated route.
Began
The year that the bus rapid transit began operating for passenger service.
Stations
Stations connected by transfers are counted as one station, unless otherwise note.
Length (km)
Track length; lines which share track are counted once or Corridor length; lines which sharing the same corridor are counted once.
Notes/Description
A short objective description and subjective of routes bus rapid transit ridership and passengers (daily).
Type
eBRT - Electric Bus Rapid Transit, using Trolleybuses or eBRT using Electric buses or other source.
BRT certified
ITDP standards-and-guides and bus-rapid-transit-standard year rewards.

=== Argentina ===
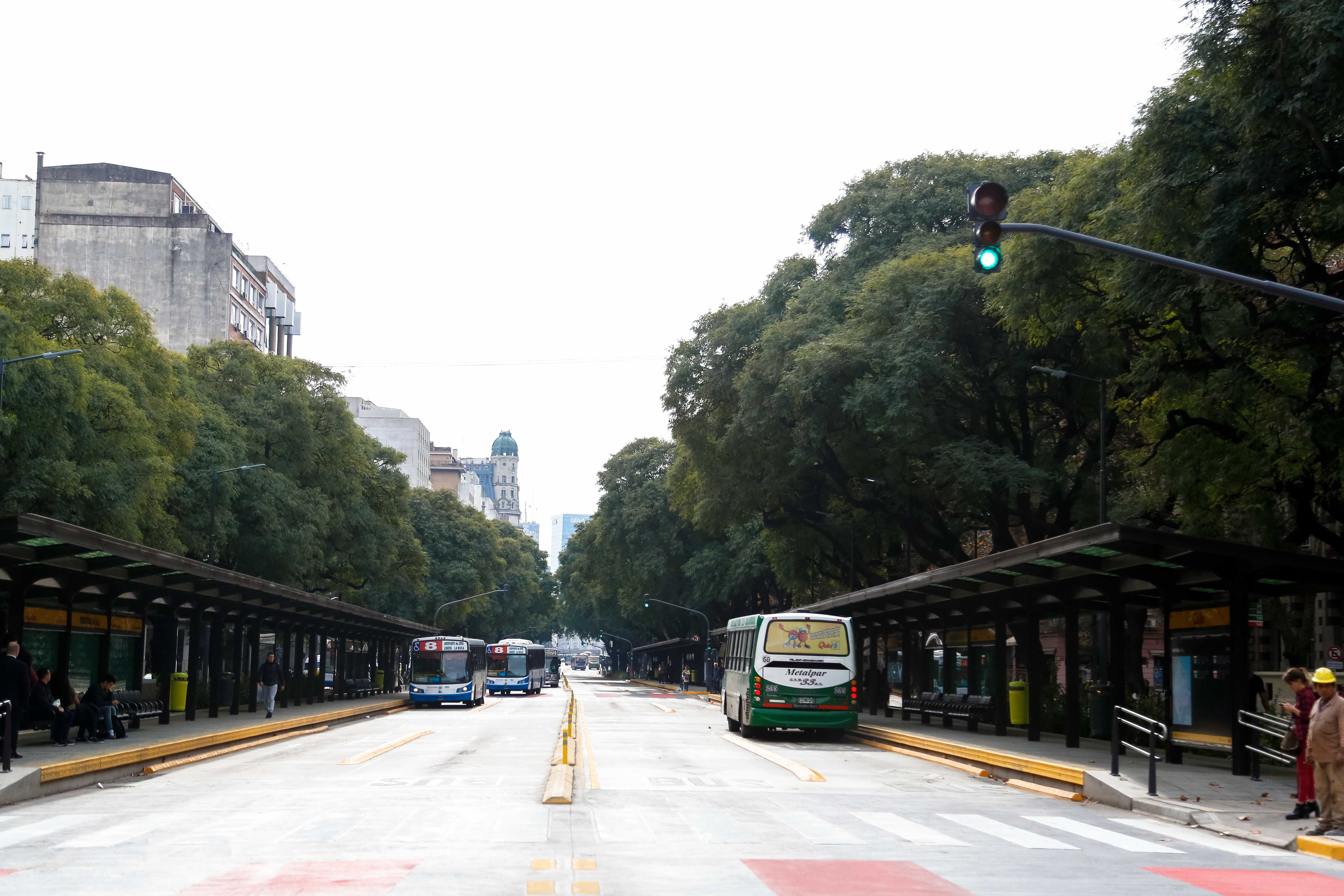
Metrobus del Bajo Buenos Aires

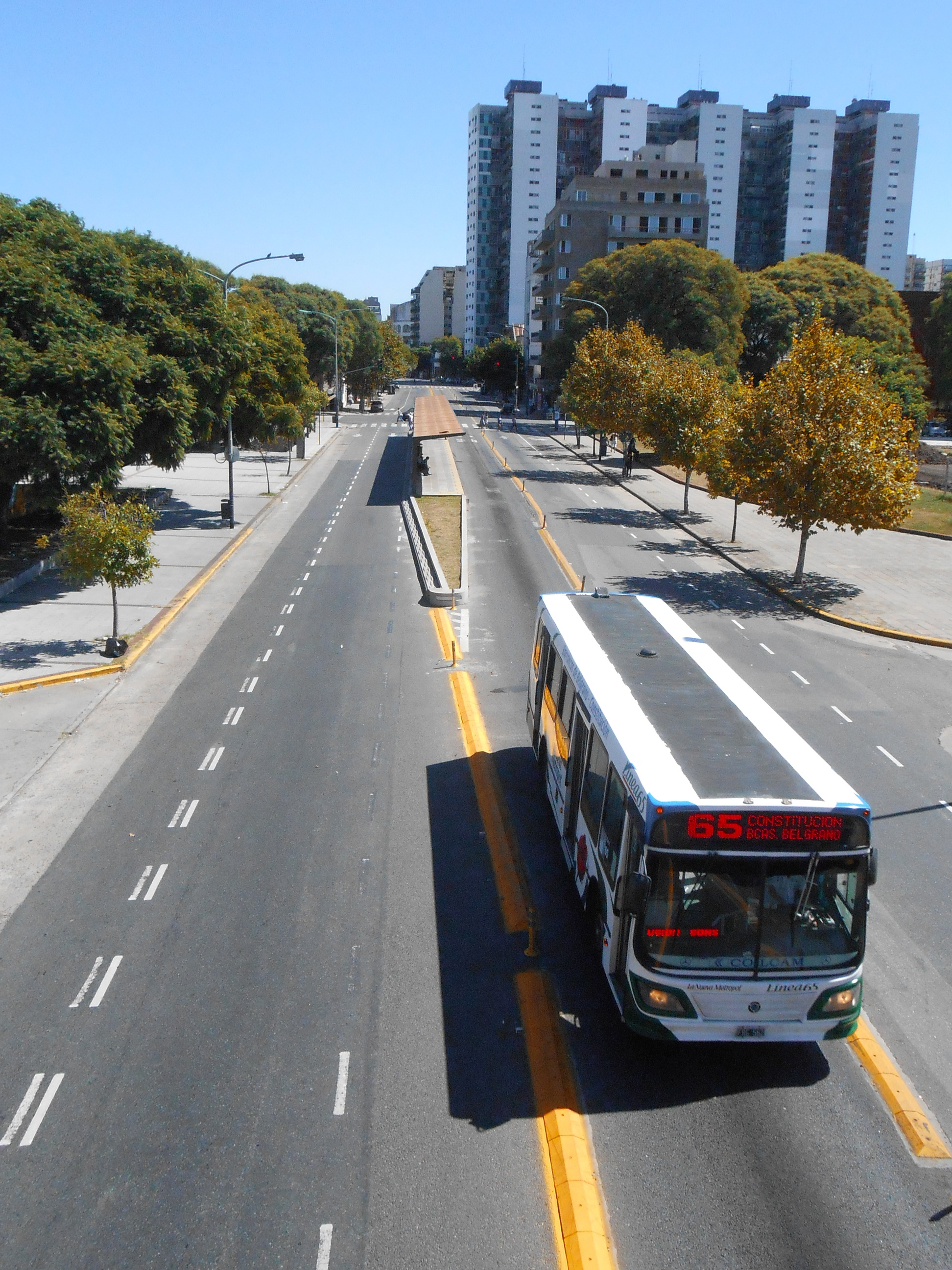
Metrobús de Buenos Aires, Estación Garrahan

BRT systems in Argentina
City	System name	Lines	Began	Stations	Length	Notes/Description	Type	BRT certified
Buenos Aires	Metrobús	Juan B. Justo	31 May 2011	21	12.5 km (7.8 mi)			Bronze BRT certified (2013).
Buenos Aires	Metrobús	9 de Julio	24 July 2013	17	3.5 km (2.2 mi)			Silver BRT certified (2014).
Buenos Aires	Metrobús	Sur	14 August 2013	37	23 km (14 mi)			Not BRT certified in 2014.
Buenos Aires	Metrobús	25 de Mayo	5 October 2015	0	7.5 km (4.7 mi)			Not BRT certified in 2022.
Buenos Aires	Metrobús	San Martín	27 April 2016	12	5.8 km (3.6 mi)			Not BRT certified in 2022.
Buenos Aires	Metrobús	Norte Etapa 2	24 November 2016	21	2.8 km (1.7 mi)			Not BRT certified in 2022.
Buenos Aires	Metrobús	del Bajo	6 June 2017	25	2.9 km (1.8 mi)			Not BRT certified in 2022.
Buenos Aires	Metrobús	Norte	17 June 2015	39	2.7 km (1.7 mi)			Not BRT certified in 2022.
Vicente López Partido	Metrobús	Norte	17 June 2015	39	2.2 km (1.4 mi)			Not BRT certified in 2022.
Quilmes	Calchaquí Metrobus	10	4 June 2019	12	8.7 km (5.4 mi)			Not BRT certified in 2022.
La Matanza Partido	La Matanza Metrobus	1	5 May 2017	17	16 km (9.9 mi)			Not BRT certified in 2022.
Neuquén	Neuquen Metrobus	9	February 2019	13	6 km (3.7 mi)			Not BRT certified in 2022.
Rosario	Rosario Metrobus	Norte	30 June 2016	6	1.8 km (1.1 mi)			Not BRT certified in 2022.
Santa Fe	Metrobus (Santa Fe)	1	3 May 2017	15	5.7 km (3.5 mi)			Not BRT certified in 2022.
Tres de Febrero Partido	Tres de Febrero Metrobus	1	6 October 2017	7	3.3 km (2.1 mi)			Not BRT certified in 2022.
Posadas	Greater Posadas Metropolitan Integrated Transport System	1	1 April 2007	-	-			Not BRT certified in 2014.
Córdoba	Solo Bus Av. Sabattini	1	2014	9	5 km (3.1 mi)			Not BRT certified in 2014.

=== Bolivia ===
BRT systems in Bolivia
City	System name	Operator	Began	Lines	Stations	Length	Notes/Description	Type	BRT certified
La Paz	La Paz	Municipal Transportation System (SETRAM)	24 February 2014	8	174	-			Not BRT certified in 2022.
El Alto	Wayna Bus (Sariri BRT)	Integrated Municipal Transportation Service	3 March 2015	1	60	-	Sariri BRT		Not BRT certified in 2022.
Santa Cruz de la Sierra	Santa Cruz de la Sierra Bus Rapid Transit System	-	13 May 2019	1	120	-			Not BRT certified in 2022.

=== Brazil ===
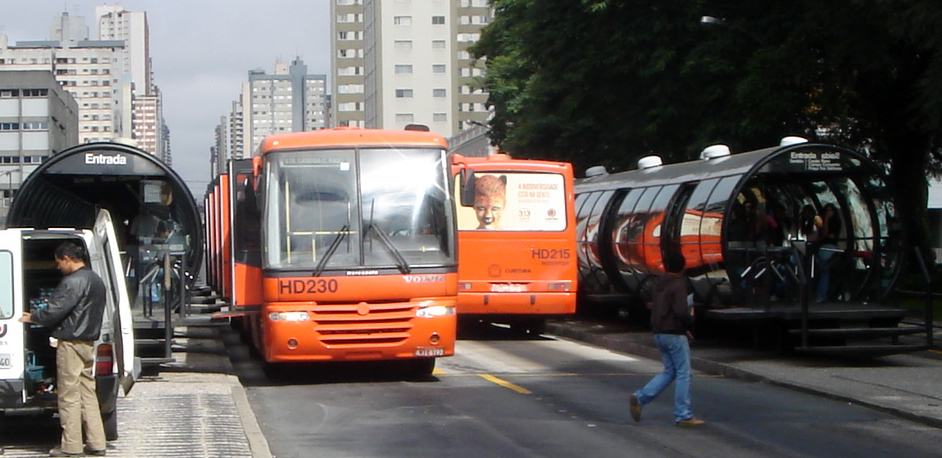
RIT's double articulated buses servicing tube stations in downtown Curitiba

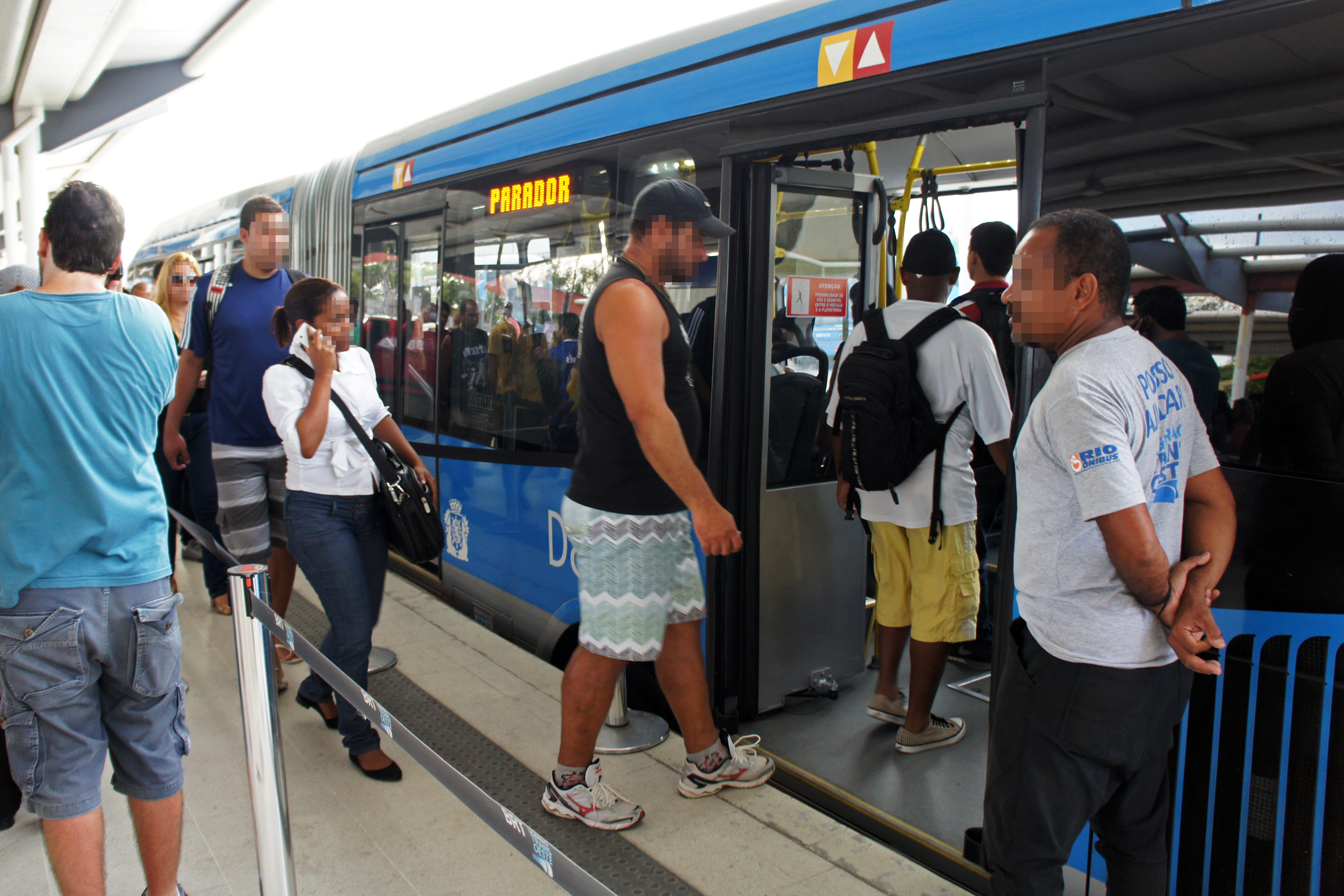
Passengers boarding a Transoeste articulated bus at the Barra da Tijuca terminal in Rio de Janeiro

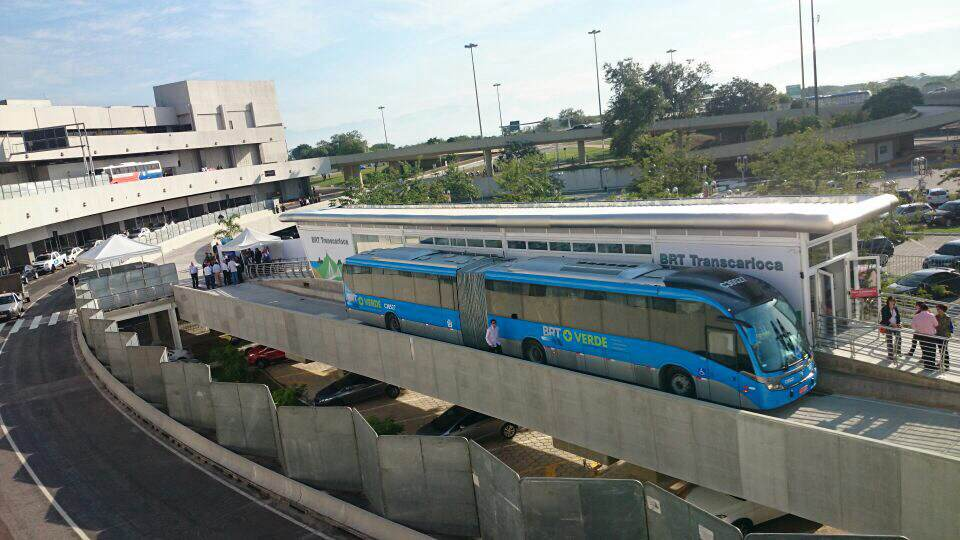
Transcarioca station at Galeão International Airport in Rio de Janeiro

In the following table, BRT systems in light blue are under construction.

BRT systems in Brazil
City	System name	Operator	Began	Lines	Stations	Length	Notes/Description	Type	BRT certified
Criciúma	Av. Centenírio	Criciumense Urban Transport Association (ACTU)	1996	3	16	8 km (5.0 mi)			Not BRT certified in 2013.
Curitiba	Rede Integrada de Transporte	Integrated Transport Network (RIT)	1974	6	21	81.4 km (50.6 mi)			6 Silver + 1 Gold BRT corridors certified (2013).
Curitiba	Rede Integrada de Transporte	Boqueirao	-	-	-	10.3 km (6.4 mi)			6 Silver + 1 Gold BRT corridors certified (2013).
Curitiba	Rede Integrada de Transporte	South Circular	-	-	-	14.5 km (9.0 mi)			6 Silver + 1 Gold BRT corridors certified (2013).
Curitiba	Rede Integrada de Transporte	East line	-	-	-	12.4 km (7.7 mi)			6 Silver + 1 Gold BRT corridors certified (2013).
Curitiba	Rede Integrada de Transporte	Green Line	-	-	-	7.0 km (4.3 mi)			6 Silver + 1 Gold BRT corridors certified (2013).
Curitiba	Rede Integrada de Transporte	North line	-	-	-	8.9 km (5.5 mi)			6 Silver + 1 Gold BRT corridors certified (2013).
Curitiba	Rede Integrada de Transporte	West line	-	-	-	10.4 km (6.5 mi)			6 Silver + 1 Gold BRT corridors certified (2013).
Curitiba	Rede Integrada de Transporte	South line	-	-	-	10.6 km (6.6 mi)			6 Silver + 1 Gold BRT corridors certified (2013).
São Paulo	São Mateus–Jabaquara Metropolitan Corridor	ABD Metropolitan Corridor, ABD Headband and (Next Mobilidade)	3 December 1988	13	111	33 km (21 mi)		eBRT trolleybuses	Bronze BRT corridors certified (2013).
São Paulo	Expresso Tiradentes	Expresso Tiradentes (Southeast Axis) and (SPTrans)	8 March 2007	2	10	8.2 km (5.1 mi)			Silver BRT corridors certified (2013).
São Paulo	Diadema–Morumbi Metropolitan Corridor	ABD Metropolitan Corridor, ABD Morumbi Extension (Metra)	30 July 2010	1	28	12 km (7.5 mi)			Basic BRT corridors certified (2014).
São Paulo	Guarulhos–São Paulo Metropolitan Corridor	Empresa Metropolitana de Transportes Urbanos de São Paulo (EMTU) and (Metra)	3 July 2013	12	22	12.3 km (7.6 mi)			Not BRT certified in 2015.
São Paulo	Itapevi–Butantã Metropolitan Corridor	Empresa Metropolitana de Transportes Urbanos de São Paulo (EMTU) and (Metra)	March 2018	-	42	23.6 km (14.7 mi)			Not BRT certified in 2022.
São Paulo	Corredor Metropolitano Noroeste	Empresa Metropolitana de Transportes Urbanos de São Paulo (EMTU) and (Metra)	2010	1	30	32.7 km (20.3 mi)			Not BRT certified in 2013.
São Paulo	BRT ABC	Next Mobilidade	2023	3	19	17.3 km (10.7 mi)		eBRT electric buses	Not BRT certified in 2024.
São José dos Campos	Linha Verde	-	2022	1	13	22 km (14 mi)		eBRT electric buses	Not BRT certified in 2022.
Sorocaba	BRT Sorocaba	Urbes	30 August 2020	2	12	12.2 km (7.6 mi)			Not BRT certified in 2022.
Rio de Janeiro	TransOeste	Rio de Janeiro BRT (MOBI-Rio)	6 June 2012	1	66	56 km (35 mi)			2 Gold +2 Silver BRT corridors certified (2013).
Rio de Janeiro	TransCarioca	Rio de Janeiro BRT (MOBI-Rio)	1 June 2014	1	46	39 km (24 mi)			2 Gold +2 Silver BRT corridors certified (2014).
Rio de Janeiro	TransOlímpica	Rio de Janeiro BRT (MOBI-Rio)	9 July 2016	1	21	26 km (16 mi)			2 Silver +2 Gold BRT corridors certified (2016).
Rio de Janeiro	TransBrasil	Rio de Janeiro BRT (MOBI-Rio)	24 February 2024	1	19	26 km (16 mi)			2 Silver +2 Gold BRT corridors certified (2024).
Goiânia	Anhanguera Axis	Governo do Estado de Goiás (Metrobus)	1976	6	19	13.5 km (8.4 mi)			Bronze BRT certified (2014).
Goiânia	BRT Norte-Sul	Governo do Estado de Goiás (RedeMob Consórcio)	2024	5	32	29.6 km (18.4 mi)			Not BRT certified in 2024.
Porto Alegre	Companhia Carris Porto-Alegrense	Empresa Pública de Transporte e Circulação (EPTC)	8 March 2014	11	9	55 km (34 mi)			Basic + Bronze BRT corridors certified (2016).
Belo Horizonte	BRT Move	SETRA (municipal), SINTRAM (metropolitan)	8 March 2014	29	56	23.1 km (14.4 mi)			1 Silver + 1 Gold BRT corridor certified (2014).
Belo Horizonte	BRT Move	Linha - Antonio Carlos	May 2014	1	24	16 km (9.9 mi)			1 Silver + 1 Gold BRT corridor certified (2014).
Belo Horizonte	BRT Move	Linha - Cristiano Machado	8 March 2014	1	9	7.1 km (4.4 mi)			1 Silver + 1 Gold BRT corridor certified (2014).
Salvador, Bahia	BRT Salvador	Salvador Municipal Public Passenger Bus Transportation Service (STCO)	1 October 2022	4	14	6 km (3.7 mi)		eBRT electric buses	Not BRT certified in 2022.
Campinas	BRT of Campinas	-	25 November 2022	7	17	36.6 km (22.7 mi)	Under construction from 2017 to 2020, it will have two main parallel lines Campo Grande and Ouro Verde and a secondary link Perimetral		Not BRT certified in 2022.
Feira de Santana	BRT Feira	Sistema (SMTT) Getúlio Vargas e João Durval	2020	2	16	20.5 km (12.7 mi)			Not BRT certified in 2022.
Florianópolis	Integrated Mobility System (SIM)	Phoenix Consortium, COTISA, Florianópolis City Hall	-	-	-	17 km (11 mi)	Under construction		
Uberlândia	Integrated Transport System (SIT)	Southeast Structural Corridor (Av. João Naves de Ávila)	8 September 1996	174	16	7.5 km (4.7 mi)			Silver BRT certified (2014).
Belém	BRT Belem	Belém River, Nova Marambaia, Guamá River, Via Loc	2019	4	33	20 km (12 mi)			Not BRT certified in 2019.
Uberaba	BRT Vetor	Vetor East-West	31 January 2015	2	10	5.1 km (3.2 mi)			Silver BRT certified (2016).
Juiz de Fora	Av. Barão do Rio Branco	-	1982	1	8	3.1 km (1.9 mi)			Not BRT certified in 2013.
Londrina	CMTU Londrina	3 linha, Rua João Cândido and Rua Duque de Caxias and Winston Churchill. Companhia Municipal De Trânsito E Urbanização De Londrina (CMTU)	2010	3	29	6.8 km (4.2 mi)			Not BRT certified in 2013.
Fortaleza	Fortaleza Express	ETUFOR (Fortaleza Urban Transport Company) Socicam	18 April 2015	2	15	17.4 km (10.8 mi)			Not BRT certified in 2015.
Brasília	BRT Express DF	Expresso DF Sul	2 April 2014	4	20	25.9 km (16.1 mi)			Bronze BRT certified (2014).
Recife	BRT Freeway of Recife	-	2014	2	44	49.9 km (31.0 mi)			Basic + Bronze BRT corridors certified (2016).
Recife	BRT Freeway of Recife	-	2014	Via Livre East/West	18	8.2 km (5.1 mi)			Basic + Bronze BRT corridors certified (2016).
Recife	BRT Freeway of Recife	-	2014	Via Livre North/South	26	22.8 km (14.2 mi)			Basic + Bronze BRT corridors certified (2016).
Teresina	Inthegra	SITT(Teresina Transport System) STRANS SETUT	2 July 2016	7	40	24 km (15 mi)			Not BRT certified in 2022.
Maringá	Mega BRT	Morangueira - Kakogawa, Transporte Coletivo Cidade Canção (TCCC)	2018	13	11	3.8 km (2.4 mi)			Not BRT certified in 2022.
Manaus	Expresso	Bus Leader, Bus Company São Pedro, Express Coroado, Eucatur Group, Global GNZ, Via Verde,Vega	14 December 2002	3	4	20 km (12 mi)			Not BRT certified in 2013.
Natal, Rio Grande do Norte	Av. Bernardo Vieira	Sistema Integrado de Transportes	2008	1	8	3.5 km (2.2 mi)			Not BRT certified in 2013.
Niterói	Corredor Metropolitano Alameda São Boaventura	2 linha Niterói	2010	1	6	8 km (5.0 mi)			Not BRT certified in 2013.
Niterói	TransOceânica	2 linha Niterói	2019	1	13	9 km (5.6 mi)			BRT certified (2024).

=== Chile ===
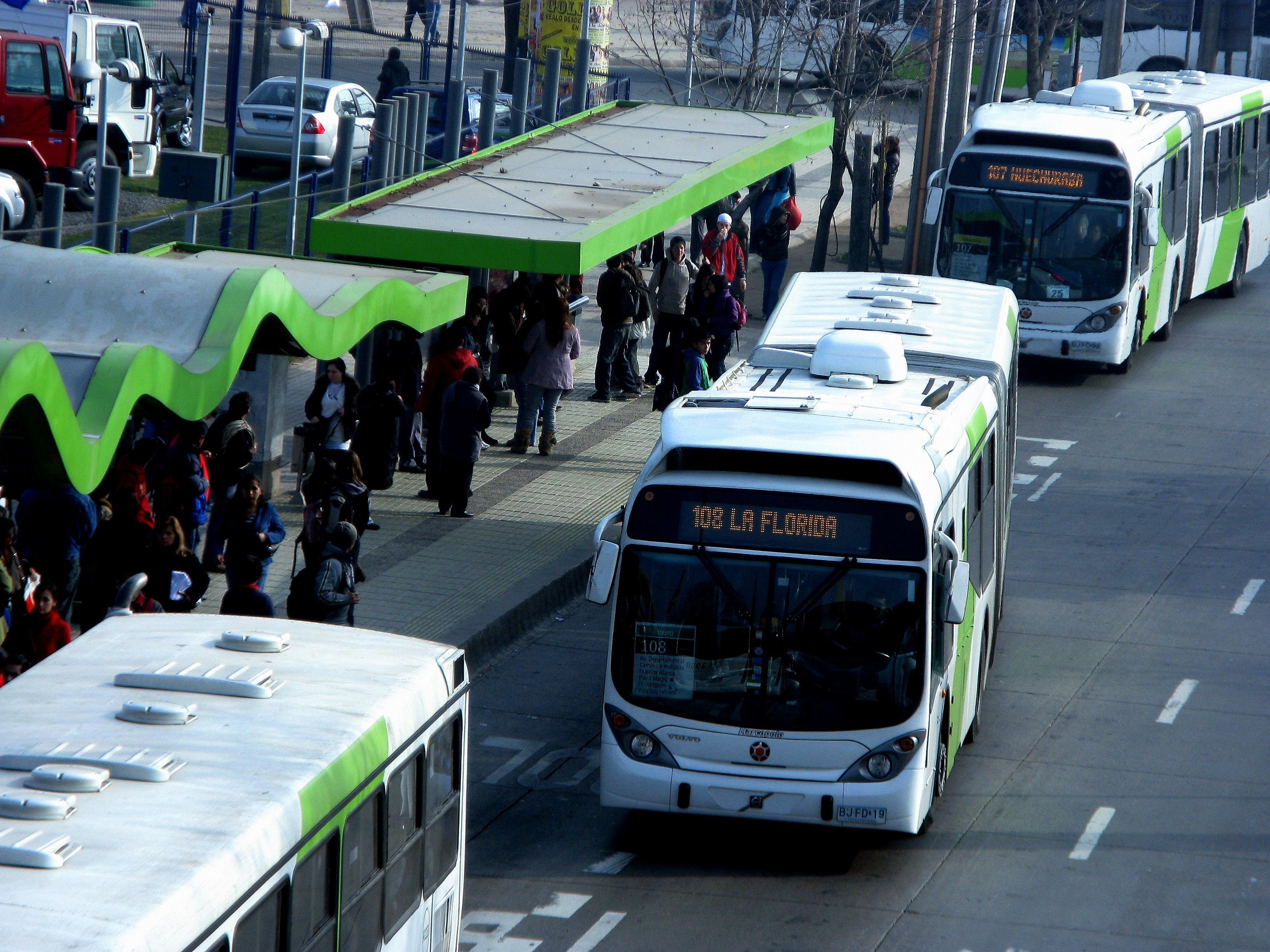
Transantiago articulated buses in Santiago

In the following table, BRT systems in light blue are under construction.

BRT systems in Chile
City	System name	Operator	Began	Lines	Stations	Length	Notes/Description	Type	BRT certified
Santiago	Red Metropolitana de Movilidad	STP Santiago S.A., Metro S.A., Tren Central	2007	5	29	90 km (56 mi)	Transantiago transit system is integrated between the electric Biotren and BioBus, based on dedicated bus rights-of-way.	eBRT electric buses	Bronze BRT certified (2014).
Santiago	Red Metropolitana de Movilidad	STP Santiago S.A., Metro S.A., Tren Central	2007	Greece Avenue	-	10 km (6.2 mi)	Transantiago transit system is integrated between the electric Biotren and BioBus, based on dedicated bus rights-of-way.	eBRT electric buses	Bronze BRT certified (2014).
Santiago	Red Metropolitana de Movilidad	STP Santiago S.A., Metro S.A., Tren Central	2007	Avenidas Las Industrias - Seirra Bella/Carmen	-	9.2 km (5.7 mi)	Transantiago transit system is integrated between the electric Biotren and BioBus, based on dedicated bus rights-of-way.	eBRT electric buses	Bronze BRT certified (2014).
Santiago	Red Metropolitana de Movilidad	STP Santiago S.A., Metro S.A., Tren Central	2007	Pedro Aguirre Cerda - Exhibition/Bascunan Guerrero	-	11.5 km (7.1 mi)	Transantiago transit system is integrated between the electric Biotren and BioBus, based on dedicated bus rights-of-way.	eBRT electric buses	Bronze BRT certified (2014).
Santiago	Red Metropolitana de Movilidad	STP Santiago S.A., Metro S.A., Tren Central	2007	Santa Rosa North	-	7.2 km (4.5 mi)	Transantiago transit system is integrated between the electric Biotren and BioBus, based on dedicated bus rights-of-way.	eBRT electric buses	Bronze BRT certified (2014).
Santiago	Red Metropolitana de Movilidad	STP Santiago S.A., Metro S.A., Tren Central	2007	Santa Rosa South	-	8.5 km (5.3 mi)	Transantiago transit system is integrated between the electric Biotren and BioBus, based on dedicated bus rights-of-way.	eBRT electric buses	Bronze BRT certified (2014).
Concepción	SEREMITT Biobus	Intermodal Transport Service SA	26 May 2006	3	46	15.2 km (9.4 mi)			Not BRT certified in 2014.
Concepción	Red Mobility Conception Network	EFE Sur	2026	2	-	50 km (31 mi)	Red Concepción de Movilidadses	eBRT electric buses	

=== Colombia ===
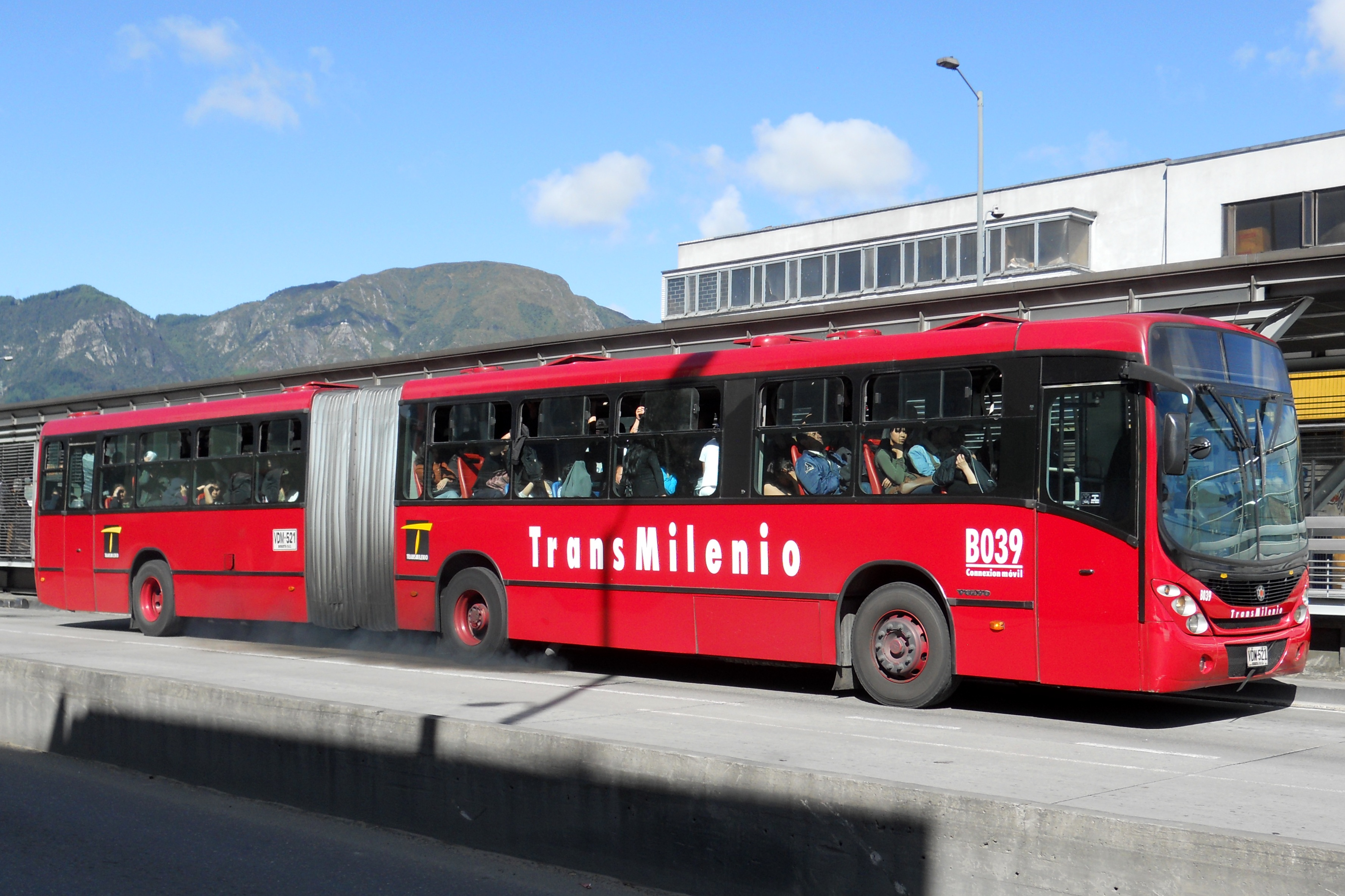
TransMilenio bus in Bogotá

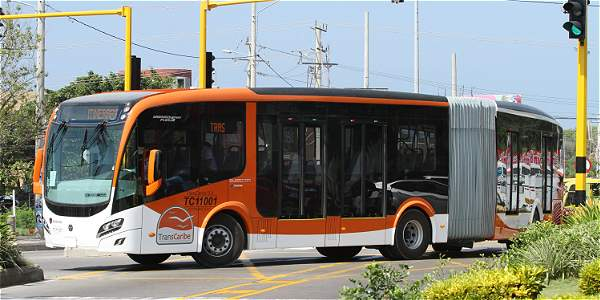
Transcaribe bus in Cartagena, Colombia

BRT systems in Colombia
City	System name	Operator	Began	Lines	Stations	Length	Notes/Description	Type	BRT certified
Bogotá	TransMilenio	Consorcio Express, Gmovil, BMO Sur, Connexion Móvil, Somos K, SI18, Somos Bogotá Usme	4 December 2000	12	143	114.4 km (71.1 mi)	Bogotá's segregated, four-lane TransMilenio system has a maximum peak-load capacity of 45,000 passengers per hour per direction (pphpd) on its busiest line. The system uses modular median stations that serve both directions and enable prepaid, multiple-door, level boarding. The average stop time is 24 seconds. Trunk-line terminals have integrated bicycle parking; the fare card opens a gate to a secure bicycle parking area. Two lanes in each direction permit "Quickways" (local service on the inside lane combined with express service, skipping four or five stations at a time). TransMilenio was described as a "model BRT system" in the National Bus Rapid Transit Institute's May 2006 report. It serves Bogotá with high-capacity, articulated, three-door buses. Bi-articulated buses are used on the busiest routes, and a smart card system is used for fare collection. Despite its large capacity, Transmilenio had problems with overcrowding.		2 Silver + 5 Gold BRT corridors certified (2013).
Bogotá	TransMilenio	TransMilenio - Autonorte	2 February 2002	1	-	11.6 km (7.2 mi)			Silver BRT certified (2013).
Bogotá	TransMilenio	TransMilenio - Suba	29 April 2006	1	-	9.6 km (6.0 mi)			Gold BRT certified (2013).
Bogotá	TransMilenio	TransMilenio - Caracas	-	-	-	7.3 km (4.5 mi)			Silver BRT certified (2013).
Bogotá	TransMilenio	TransMilenio - Calle 80	17 December 2000	1	-	7.5 km (4.7 mi)			Gold BRT certified (2013).
Bogotá	TransMilenio	TransMilenio - Americas	21 December 2003	1	3	12.7 km (7.9 mi)			Gold BRT certified (2013).
Bogotá	TransMilenio	TransMilenio - NQS	2005	1	-	8.6 km (5.3 mi)			Gold BRT certified (2013).
Bogotá	TransMilenio	TransMilenio - El Dorado	2005	1	-	10.8 km (6.7 mi)			Gold BRT certified (2013).
Cali	MIO	Metro Cali S.A.	1 March 2009	9	77	39 km (24 mi)	Phase I completed; phase II under construction.		Silver BRT certified (2013).
Medellín	Metroplús	Metroplus SA	22 December 2011	3	27	12.5 km (7.8 mi)	Line 2 opened 2013		Gold BRT certified (2013).
Barranquilla	Transmetro	Transmetro S.A.	7 April 2010	2	18	13.2 km (8.2 mi)			Silver BRT certified (2013).
Bucaramanga	Metrolínea	Metrolínea	22 December 2009	11	-	7.5 km (4.7 mi)			Silver BRT certified (2016).
Pereira	Megabús	-	21 August 2006	3	60	19.2 km (11.9 mi)			Silver BRT certified (2013).
Cartagena	Transcaribe	TransCaribe SA	17 November 2015	5	16	10.5 km (6.5 mi)			Silver BRT certified (2016).

=== Ecuador ===
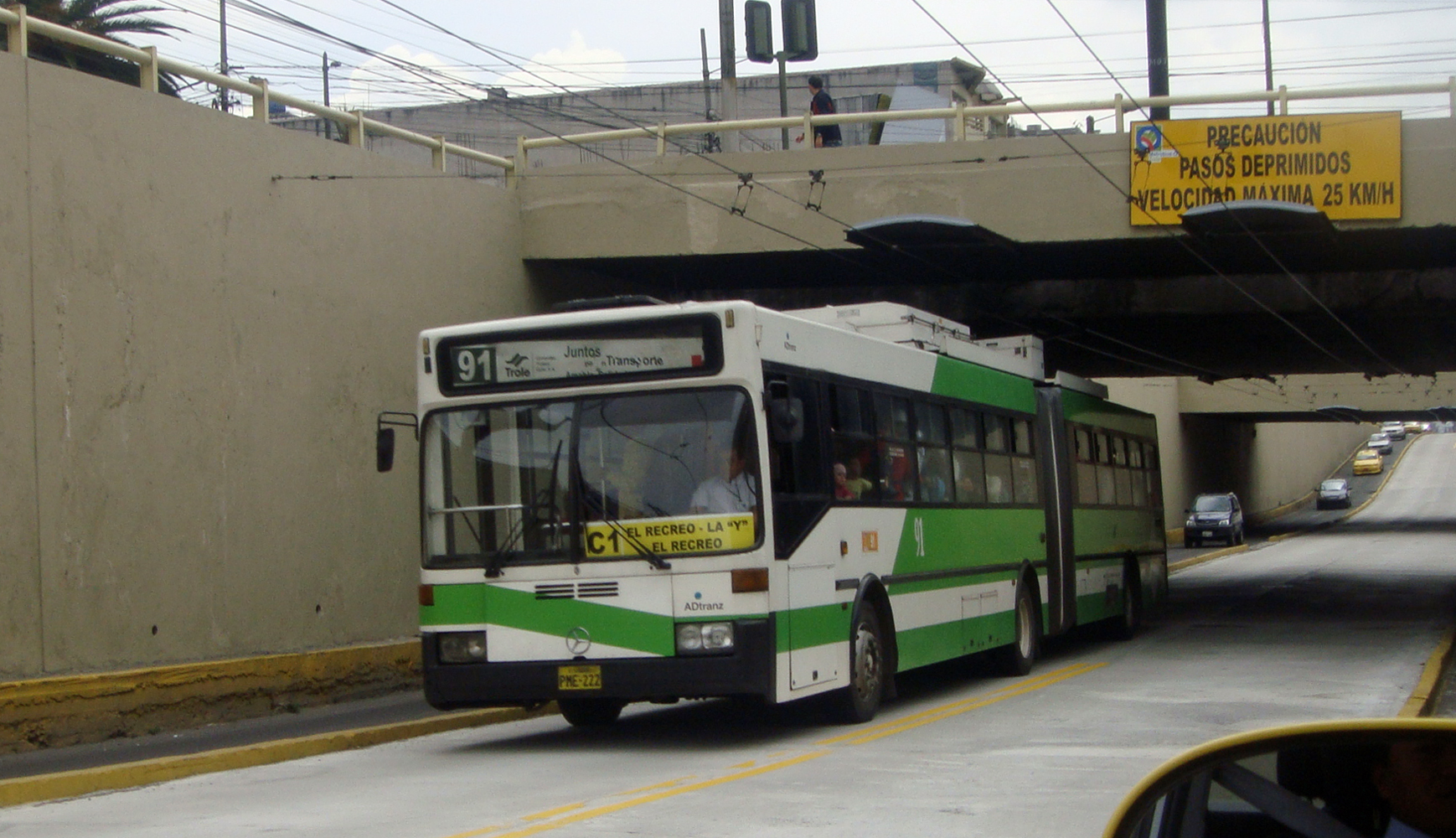
The Quito trolleybus system has lines running on exclusive BRT lanes with underpass crossings.

BRT systems in Ecuador
City	System name	Operator	Began	Lines	Stations	Length	Notes/Description	Type	BRT certified
Quito	Metrobus-Q	(Metropolitan Public Passenger Transport Company EPMTP Some private companies) Metrobus-Q - es:Trolebús de Quito, Central-Norte and Ecovia	17 December 1995	3	124	65.4 km (40.6 mi)	The BRT system Trolleybuses in Quito operated by Compañía Trolebús Quito. Plans exist to convert the northernmost portion of the system to light rail. Ecovía and Metrobus diesel BRT lines have several subsystems: Trolebús (Corredor Trole), Ecovía (Corredor Ecovía), Metrobús (Corredor Central Norte), Corredor Sur Oriental and Corredor Sur Occidental. Trolebús electric trolley buses can also operate on gas. Except for local routes, all buses are articulated.	eBRT trolleybuses	Silver BRT certified (2013).
Quito	Metrobus-Q	Metrobus - Corredor sur occidental Empresa Metropolitana de Servicios y Administración del Transporte (EMSAT)	13 July 2001	-	-	13.4 km (8.3 mi)		eBRT trolleybuses	Bronze BRT certified (2014).
Quito	Metrobus-Q	Metrobus - Corredor sur oriental	-	-	-	11.1 km (6.9 mi)		eBRT trolleybuses	Bronze BRT certified (2014).
Guayaquil	Metrovía	Fundación de Transporte Masivo Urbano de Guayaquil - Troncal 1: Guasmo-Río Daule	30 July 2006	7	26	30.51 km (18.96 mi)			Bronze BRT certified (2013).
Guayaquil	Metrovía	Metrovia - Troncal 2:	16 February 2012	-	-	13.9 km (8.6 mi)			Bronze BRT certified (2013).
Guayaquil	Metrovía	Metrovia - Troncal 3: Bastion-Centro	4 May 2008	-	-	16.5 km (10.3 mi)			Bronze BRT certified (2013).
Cuenca	Troncal (100)	Sistema Integrado de Transporte (Línea 100, Línea 200)	2014	2	-	-			Not BRT certified in 2014.
Loja	Loja Intermodal Urban Transport System (SITU)	-	18 November 2015	10	-	50 km (31 mi)			Not BRT certified in 2015.

=== French Guiana ===
In the following table, BRT systems in light blue are under construction.

BRT systems in French Guiana
City	System name	Operator	Began	Lines	Stations	Length	Notes/Description	Type	BRT certified
Cayenne	Yanéo	Yana'BUS	19 October 2026	2	24	14 km (8.7 mi)			

=== Peru ===
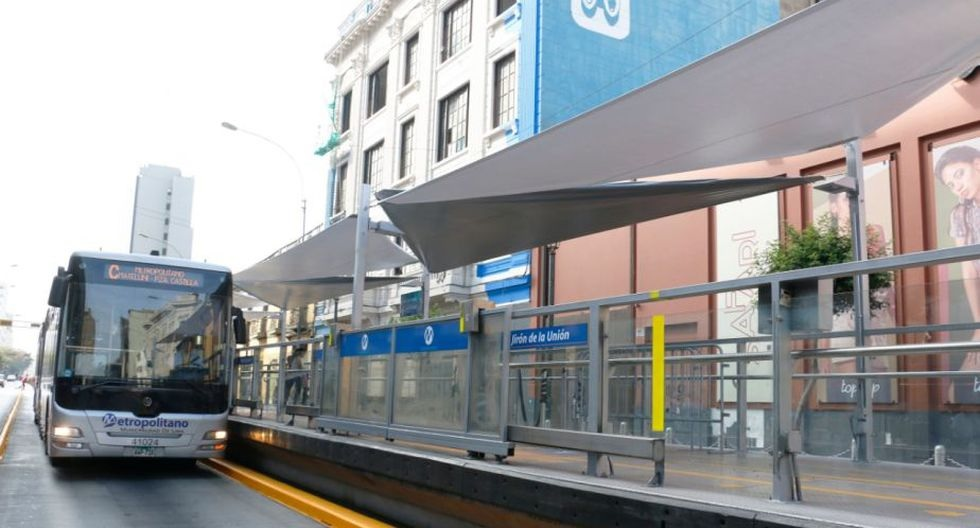
Metropolitano bus in Lima, Peru

BRT systems in Peru
City	System name	Operator	Began	Lines	Stations	Length	Notes/Description	Type	BRT certified
Lima	Metropolitano	Perú Masivo S.A., Lima Bus Internacional 1 S.A., Lima Vías Express S.A., Transvial Lima S.A.C.	October 2010	1	38	33 km (21 mi)	Metropolitano is Peru's first mass transit system implemented in several decades. It runs from the northern district of Independencia to the southern district of Chorrillos, on roads such as Avenida Paseo de la República, Av. Alfonso Ugarte and Av. Tupac Amaru.		Bronze BRT certified (2013).
Arequipa	Arequipa Integrated Transportation System	11 consortia	30 May 2019	11	-	20 km (12 mi)	Pre-operational Phase May 2019 - November 2024 under construction.		Not BRT certified in 2022.
Trujillo	Trujillo Integrated Transportation System (SITT)	Trujillo Metropolitan Transport (TMT)	September 2011,	2	-	-			Not BRT certified in 2012.

=== Uruguay ===
BRT systems in Uruguay
City	System name	Operator	Began	Lines	Stations	Length	Notes/Description	Type	BRT certified
Montevideo	Agraciada/Garzón Corridor	Metropolitan Transportation System (STM)	2012	2	17	6 km (3.7 mi)			Bronze BRT certified (2014).

=== Venezuela ===
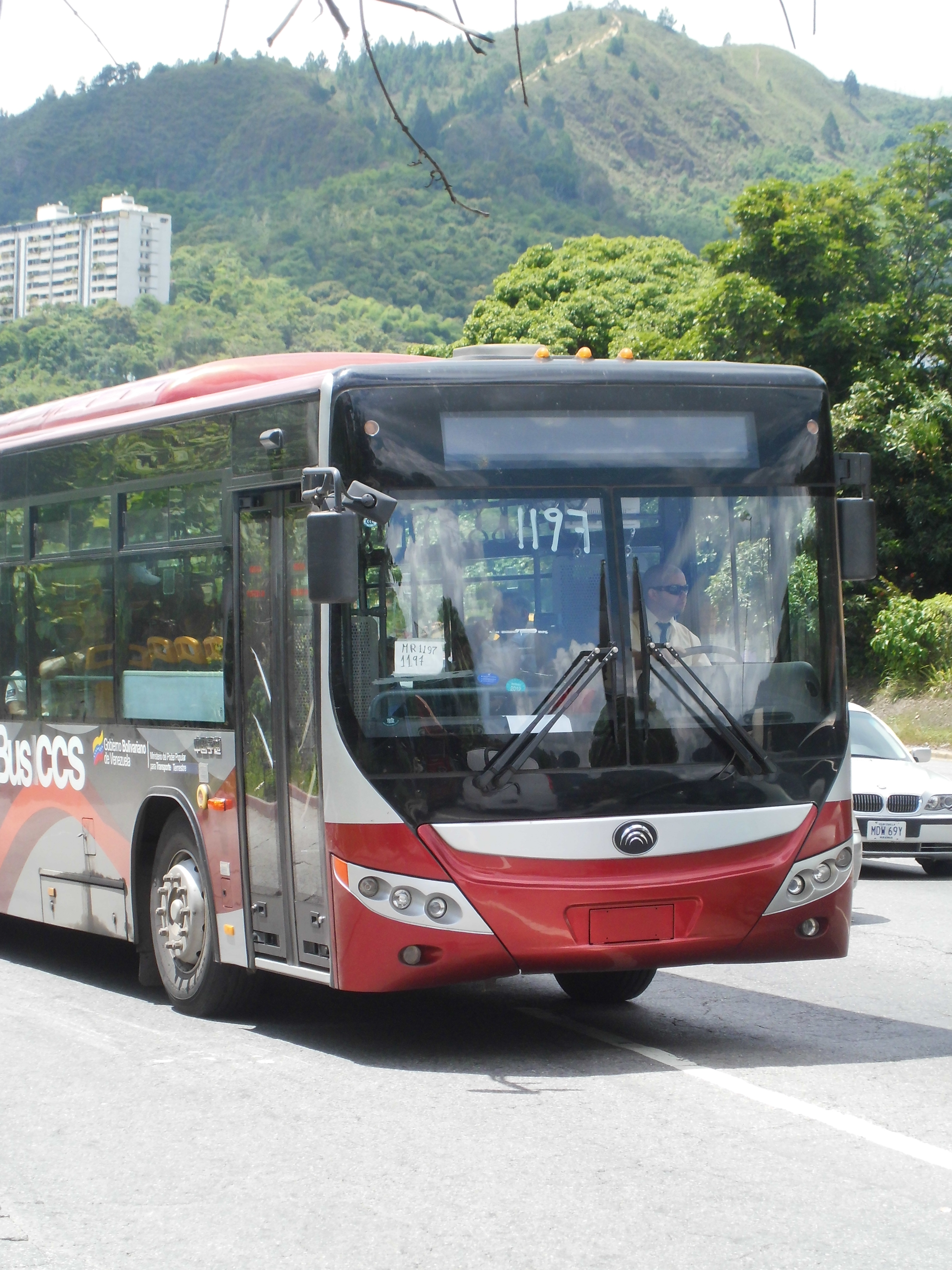
BusCaracas in Caracas

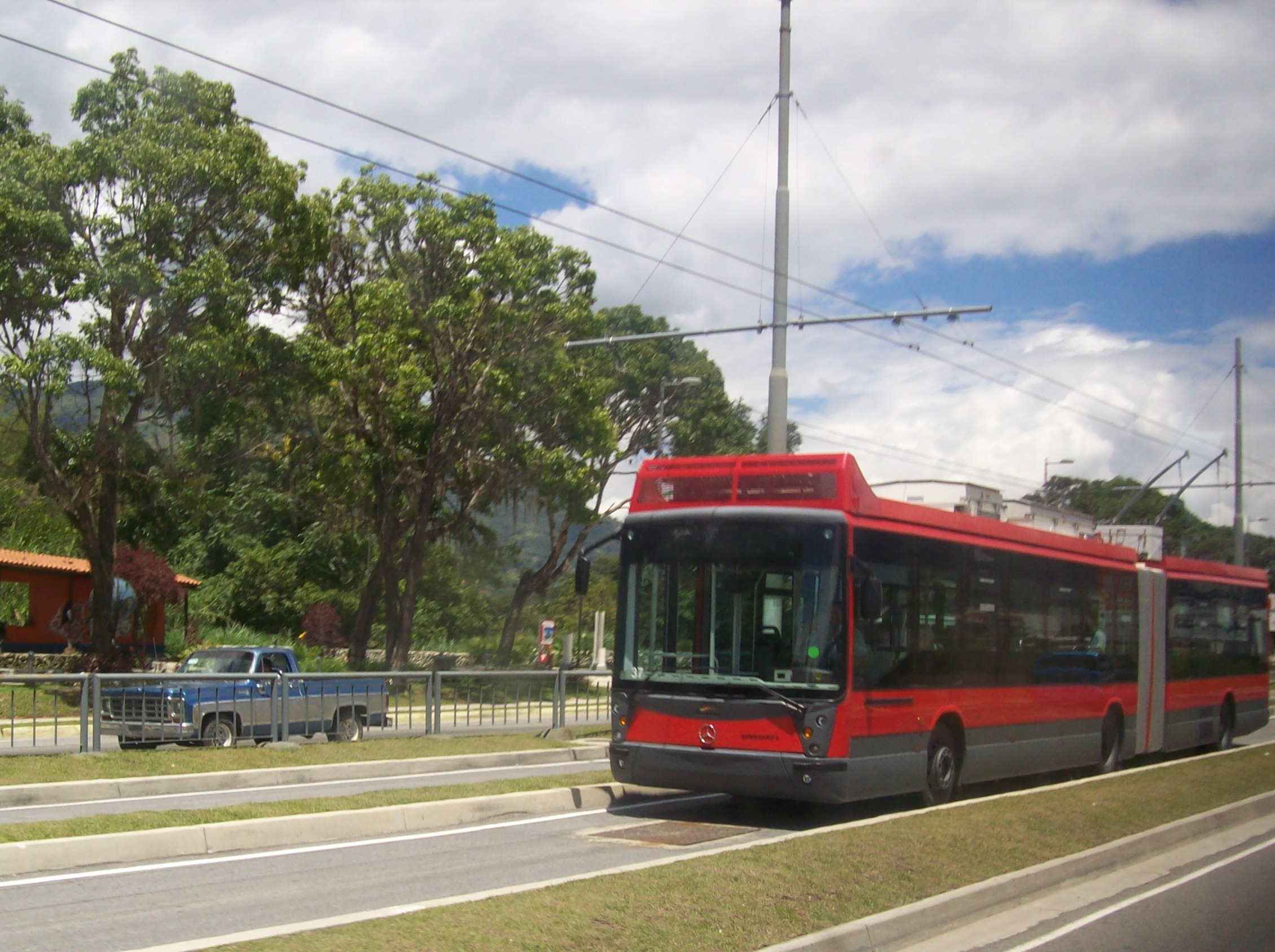
Trolleybuses in Mérida

In the following table, BRT systems in light blue are under construction.

BRT systems in Venezuela
City	System name	Operator	Began	Lines	Stations	Length	Notes/Description	Type	BRT certified
Caracas	BusCaracas	Metro de Caracas C.A.	October 2012	1	11	5.2 km (3.2 mi)	Corridor line 7		Silver BRT certified (2014).
Mérida	Trolmérida	Tromerca (Trolebús Mérida, CA)	18 June 2007	3	22	15.2 km (9.4 mi)	eBRT trolleybuses, ended operation August 2016 as trolleybus.		Not BRT certified in 2022.
Barquisimeto	Transbarca	-	14 September 2013	2	41	24 km (15 mi)			Not BRT certified in 2022.
Guayana City	BTR Battle of Sanfelix	TransBolivar	December 2015	1	2	20 km (12 mi)			Not BRT certified in 2016.
Gran Barcelona	TransAnzoátegui	-	19 November 2015	4	20	33 km (21 mi)			Not BRT certified in 2016.
Maracay	TransMaracay	TransAragua SA	18 April 2015	1	13	8.1 km (5.0 mi)			Not BRT certified in 2016.
Valencia	TransCarabobo	-	11 July 2014	6	156	-			Not BRT certified in 2016.
Barinas	Barinas Bus	BUSBARINAS	11 March 2013	10	10	33 km (21 mi)			Not BRT certified in 2016.
Coro	TransFalcon	TransFalcón CA	27 March 2014	1	7	-			Not BRT certified in 2014.
Maracaibo	TransMaracaibo	-	31 August 2009	1	-	-	Phase 1A is operated by Piotrans Pty Ltd, while Phase 1B is operated by Litsamaiso Pty Ltd.		Not BRT certified in 2014.
Maracaibo	TransMaracaibo	-	14 October 2013	1	18	18 km (11 mi)	Phase 1A is operated by Piotrans Pty Ltd, while Phase 1B is operated by Litsamaiso Pty Ltd.		Not BRT certified in 2014.
