= Transport in Quito =

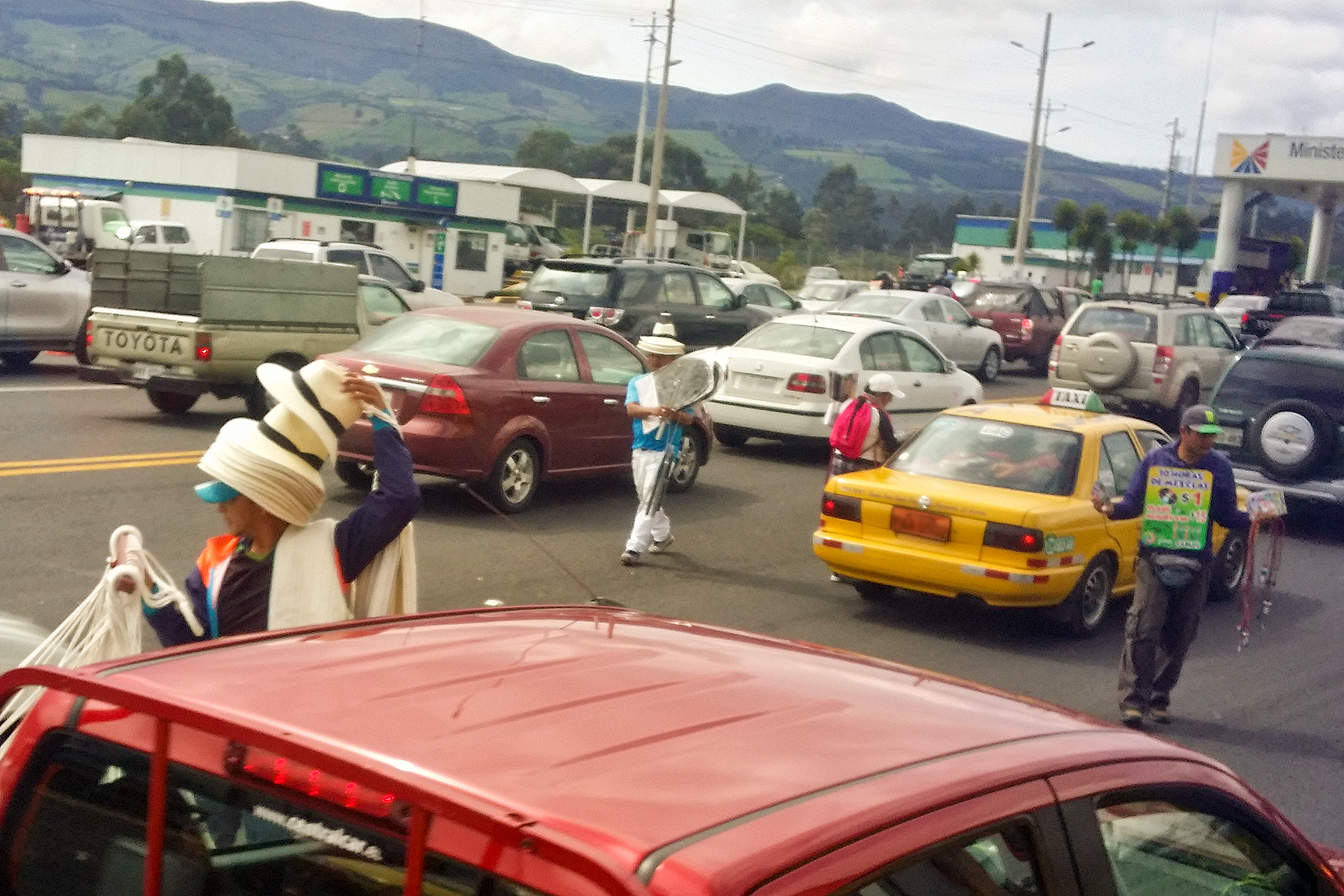
Roads are major form of transport in Quito

Transport in Quito, Ecuador consists of a variety of modes.

== Metro ==
The Quito Metro (Spanish: Metro de Quito), abbreviated as MDQ, is a rapid transit system in Quito. It currently consists of a single 23 km (14 mi) line with 15 stations, which has been operational since January 2023.

== Roads ==
Although public transportation is the primary form of travel in the city, including fleets of taxis that continually cruise the roadways, the use of private vehicles has increased substantially during the past decade. Because of growing road congestion in many areas, there were plans to construct a light rail system, which were conceived to replace the northern portion of the Trole. These plans have been ruled out and replaced by the construction of the first metro line (subway) in 2012. It was in operation on May 2, 2023, joining the existing public transportation network. Because Quito is about 40 km (25 mi) long and 5 km (3.1 mi) at its widest, most of the important avenues of the city extend from north to south. The two main motorways that go from the northern part of the city to the southern are Avenue Oriental (Corridor Periférico Oriental) on the eastern hills that border the city, and Avenue Occidental on the western side of the city on the Pichincha volcano. The street 10 de Agosto also runs north to south through most of the city, running down the middle of it. The historic center of the city is based on a grid pattern, despite the hills, with the streets Venezuela, Chile, García Moreno, and Guayaquil being the most important.

== Mainline railways ==
There is a railway that goes through the southern part of Quito and passes through the Estación de Chimbacalle. It is managed by the Empresa de Ferrocarriles Ecuatorianos (EFE). This railway23 km (14 mi) is nowadays used mostly for tourism.

== Buses ==
The MetrobusQ network, also known as "Red Integrada de Transporte Público", is the bus rapid transit system running in Quito, and it goes through the city from south to north. It's divided into three sections—the green line (the central trolleybus, known as El Trole), the red line (the north-east Ecovía), and the blue line (the north-west Corridor Central). In addition to the bus rapid transit system, there are many buses running in the city. The buses have both a name and a number, and they have a fixed route. Taxi cabs are all yellow, and they have meters that show the fare. There are nearly 8,800 registered taxicabs.

== Cycling ==
Bici Q is a bicycle-sharing system started by the municipal government of the city, and it has operated since August 2012.

== Airports ==
The Mariscal Sucre International Airport serves as the city's principal airport for passenger travel and freight. The airport is located 18 km (11 mi) east of the city's center in the Tababela parish. It began operations on 20 February 2013, replacing the Old Mariscal Sucre International Airport located 10 km (6.2 mi) north of the city center within city limits. The old airport was replaced due to tall buildings and nighttime fog that made landing from the south difficult. The old airport has become a metropolitan park.
