= Line 3 =

3 Line or Line 3 may refer to:

== Public transport ==
=== Asia ===
- Line 3 (Chennai Metro), or Purple Line, under construction in India
- Line 3 (Hanoi Metro) or Văn Miếu Line, under construction in Vietnam
- Line 3 (Riyadh Metro), in Saudi Arabia
- Aqua Line (Mumbai Metro), India
- Pink Line (Pune Metro), under construction in India
- Purple Line (Kolkata Metro), India
- Ampang Line or Line 3, in Klang Valley, Malaysia
- Circle Line (Kuala Lumpur), or MRT Line 3, in Klang Valley, Malaysia
- MRT Line 3 (Metro Manila), Philippines
- Busan Metro Line 3, in South Korea
- Daegu Metro Line 3, in South Korea
- Seoul Subway Line 3, in South Korea
- Taipei Metro Line 3 or Songshan–Xindian or Green line, in Taiwan

==== China ====
- Line 3 (Beijing Subway), a subway line in Beijing
- Line 3 (Changchun Rail Transit), a light rail line in Changchun, Jilin
- Line 3 (Changsha Metro), a metro line in Changsha, Hunan
- Line 3 (Chengdu Metro), a metro line in Chengdu, Sichuan
- Line 3 (Chongqing Rail Transit), a monorail line in Chongqing
- Line 3 (Dalian Metro), a metro line in Dalian, Liaoning
- Line 3 (Dongguan Rail Transit), a planned metro line in Dongguan, Guangdong
- Line 3 (Foshan Metro), a metro line in Foshan, Guangdong
- Line 3 (Guangzhou Metro), a metro line in Guangzhou, Guangdong
- Line 3 (Hangzhou Metro), a metro line in Hangzhou, Zhejiang
- Line 3 (Harbin Metro), a metro line in Harbin, Heilongjiang
- Line 3 (Hefei Metro), a metro line in Hefei, Anhui
- Line 3 (Jinan Metro), a metro line in Jinan, Shandong
- Line 3 (Kunming Metro), a metro line in Kunming, Yunnan
- Line 3 (Nanchang Metro), a metro line in Nanchang, Jiangxi
- Line 3 (Nanjing Metro), a metro line in Nanjing, Jiangsu
- Line 3 (Nanning Metro), a metro line in Nanning, Guangxi
- Line 3 (Ningbo Rail Transit), a metro line in Ningbo, Zhejiang
- Line 3 (Qingdao Metro), a metro line in Qingdao, Shandong
- Line 3 (Shanghai Metro), a metro line in Shanghai
- Line 3 (Shenzhen Metro), a metro line in Shenzhen, Guangdong
- Line 3 (Shijiazhuang Metro), a metro line in Shijiazhuang, Hebei
- Line 3 (Suzhou Metro), a metro line in Suzhou, Jiangsu
- Line 3 (Tianjin Metro), a metro line in Tianjin
- Line 3 (Wuhan Metro), a metro line in Wuhan, Hubei
- Line 3 (Wuxi Metro), a metro line in Wuxi, Jiangsu
- Line 3 (Xiamen Metro), a metro line in Xiamen, Fujian
- Line 3 (Xi'an Metro), a metro line in Xi'an, Shaanxi
- Line 3 (Xuzhou Metro), a metro line in Xuzhou, Jiangsu
- Line 3 (Zhengzhou Metro), a metro line in Zhengzhou, Henan

=== Europe ===
- Line 3 (Athens Metro), a metro line of the Athens Metro, Athens, Greece
- Line 3 (Budapest Metro), a subway line of the Budapest Metro, Budapest, Hungary
- Line 3 (Madrid Metro), a metro line of the Madrid Metro, Madrid, Spain
- Line 3 (Metrovalencia), in Valencia, Spain
- Line 3 (Moscow Metro), the Arbatsko-Pokrovskaya line in Moscow, Russia
- Line 3 (Saint Petersburg Metro)
- Île-de-France tramway Line 3, a modern tramway in Paris
- Paris Metro Line 3, a line of the Paris Metro rapid transit system in France
- U3 (Vienna U-Bahn), a subway line of Vienna U-Bahn, Vienna, Austria

=== North America ===
==== Canada ====
- Line 3 Scarborough, a former intermediate capacity rapid transit line in Toronto
- Line 3 Red (Montreal Metro), proposed but not built
- Line 3 Ontario, an under construction subway line in Toronto

==== Mexico ====
- Mexico City Metro Line 3, a rapid transit line in Mexico City
- Mexico City Metrobús Line 3, a bus rapid transit line in Mexico City
- Line 3 of the Guadalajara urban rail system, Mexico

==== United States ====
- Route 3 (MTA Maryland), a bus route
- 3 (New York City Subway service), a rapid transit service
- 3 (Los Angeles Railway), former streetcar service
- 3 Line (Sound Transit), a future light rail line in Seattle, Washington

=== South America ===
- Line 3 (Metrovía), a bus route in Guayaquil, Ecuador
- Line 3 (Rio de Janeiro), a proposed metro line in Rio de Janeiro, Brazil
- Line 3 (São Paulo Metro), Brazil
- Santiago Metro Line 3, in Chile

=== Oceania ===
==== Australia ====
- L3 Kingsford Line, light rail line in Sydney, New South Wales
- T3 Liverpool & Inner West Line, Sydney Trains service, New South Wales

== See also ==
- Enbridge Line 3, a proposed tar sands oil pipeline
- 3 Train (disambiguation)
- 3-line, a name for the Russian Mosin–Nagant rifle
- Three-line whip, an instruction from a whip to vote in the UK parliament
- List of public transport routes numbered 3
