= EMSAT =

EMSAT may refer to:

- Empresa Metropolitana de Servicios y Administración del Transporte (Quito)
- The Encyclopedia of Materials: Science And Technology. See Elsevier.
- The Emirates Standardized Test (EmSAT)
