= List of Trolmérida stations =

Below is a list of the Trolmérida rapid transit stations in Venezuela.

== Route 1 ==
=== Operational ===
- Pozo Hondo
- Centenario
- Montalbán
- Las Cruces
- Pan de Azúcar
- La Parroquia
- La Mara
- Alto Chama
- Carrizal
- Museo de Ciencias
- Las Tapias
- El Acuario
- San Antonio
- Pie del Llano

=== Under Construction ===
- Santa Juana
- Soto Rosa
- María Mazzarello
- Campo de Oro
- Juan XXIII
- Luis Ghersy
- Medicina, facultad de
- Liceo Libertador
- Simón Bolívar (Route 2 transfer point)
- Obispo Lora (Route 2 transfer point)
- Las Américas
- Sor Juana Inés
- Plaza de Toros
- Albarregas
- Santa Ana
- Domingo Salazar
- Fundacite
- Los Chorros
- Núcleo La Hechicera
