= List of public transport routes numbered 3 =

In public transport, Route 3 may refer to:

- Route 3 (MTA Maryland), a bus route in Baltimore, Maryland and its suburbs
- Barcelona Metro line 3
- London Buses route 3
- Line 3 (Madrid Metro)
- Melbourne tram route 3
- 3 (New York City Subway service)
- Seoul Subway Line 3
- 3 Jackson, a bus route in San Francisco
- Shanghai Metro Line 3
- Southern Vectis route 3, a bus route running between Newport and Ryde on the Isle of Wight

== See also ==
- Line 3 (disambiguation)
