= 3 Train =

3 Train may refer to:

- 3 (New York City Subway service)
- Paris Metro Line 3
- Line 3 (Beijing Subway)
- Line 3 (Shanghai Metro)

== See also ==
- Line 3 (disambiguation)
