= Line 1 (Metrovía) =

Bus route in Guayaquil, Ecuador

Lane 1 of Metrovia (Guasmo - Rio Daule), Opened to the public on July 30 of 2006, it is the first Line of a total of 7 to operate in Metrovia's BRT System.

== Stations ==
=== South to North ===
Currently in Service:

- Terminal de Integración El Guasmo
- Guasmo Sur (1)
- Guasmo Norte (2)
- Ciudadela La Floresta 2 (3)
- Ciudadela La Floresta 1 (4)
- Guasmo Central (5)
- Barrio Los Tulipanes (6)
- Ciudadela La Pradera 2 (7)
- Ciudadela La Pradera 1 (8)
- Ciudadela 9 de Octubre (9)
- Mercado Caraguay (10)
- Barrio Cuba (11)
- Barrio Centenario (12)
- Hospital León Becerra (13)
- El Astillero (14)
- La Providencia (15)
- Biblioteca Municipal (17)
- El Correo (18)
- Banco Central (19)
- Jardines del Malecón (20)
- Las Peñas (21)
- Ciudadela La Atarazana (22)
- Base Naval (23)
- Terminal de Integración Río Daule

=== North to South ===
- Terminal de Integración Río Daule
- Base Naval(20)
- Ciudadela La Atarazana (19)
- Hospital Luis Vernaza (18)
- Boca 9 (17)
- La Catedral (16)
- Caja Del Seguro (15)
- La Providencia (14)
- El Astillero (13)
- Hospital León Becerra (12)
- Barrio Centenario (11)
- Barrio Cuba (10)
- Caraguay (9)
- Ciudadela La Pradera 1 (8)
- Ciudadela La Pradera 2 (7)
- Barrio Los Tulipanes (6)
- Guasmo Central (5)
- Ciudadela La Floresta 1 (4)
- Ciudadela La Floresta 2 (3)
- Guasmo Norte (2)
- Guasmo Sur (1)
- Terminal de Integración El Guasmo

== See also ==
- Metrovia BRT System
- Line 2 of Metrovia
- Line 3 of Metrovia
