= Metrovía =

Bus operator in Guayaquil, Ecuador

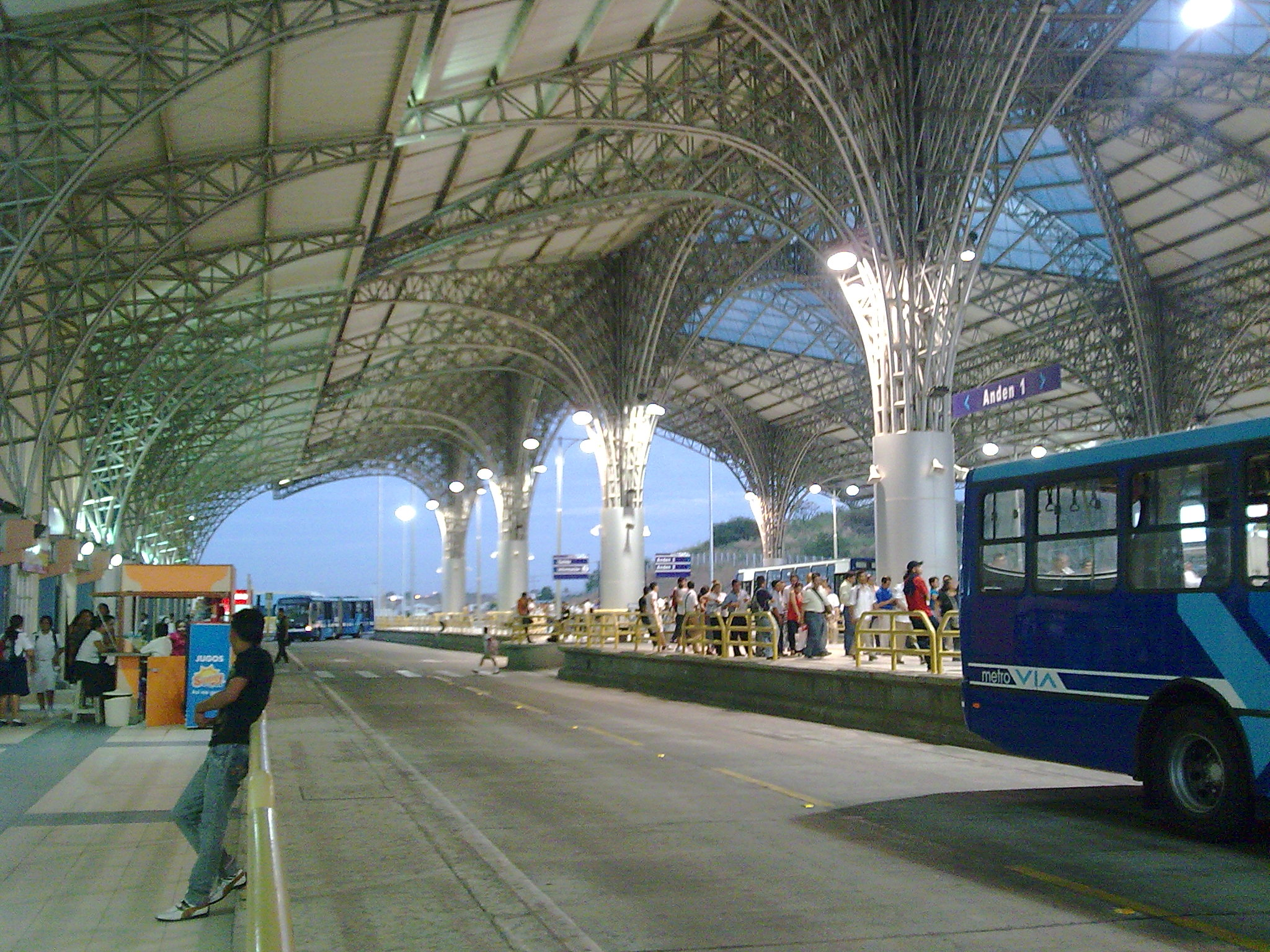

Overview
- Owner: Fundación de Transporte Masivo Urbano de Guayaquil
- Locale: ECU Guayaquil, Ecuador
- Transit type: Bus rapid transit
- Number of lines: 3
- Daily ridership: 430.000~ daily

Operation
- Began operation: July 30, 2006
- Operator: Fundación de Transporte Masivo Urbano de Guayaquil

Metrovía is a rapid bus transit system developed in Guayaquil, Ecuador, and is now a widely used means of transportation in the city.

Line 1 was inaugurated on July 30, 2006. Line 2 was inaugurated on February 16, 2012. Line 3 was inaugurated on May 4, 2008. The system will consist of a total of 7 lines.

== Metrovía Foundation ==
Established by the city, with roughly 12 employees, this foundation is responsible for overseeing the entire operation. They plan future lines and ensure everything runs smoothly. Unlike other BRT Systems' administrative entities, this one is funded entirely from space rental and other non-fare related income.

== Smart Cards ==
Smart Cards
Code	Color	Type	Fare
TM-G	Light Blue	General with photo	$0.25
TM-G	Red	General without photo	$0.25
TM-E	Orange	Students	$0.10
TM-3	Green	Seniors	$0.10
TM-D	Light Blue	Handicap	$0.05
TM-N	Light Blue	People with visual impairment	100% discount - Free Fare

== See also ==
- Trolebus of Quito
- TransMilenio of Bogotá
- Aerovia (Guayaquil)
- Line 1 of Metrovía
- Line 2 of Metrovía
- Line 3 of Metrovía
