= Trolleybuses in Mérida =

Mérida trolleybus system
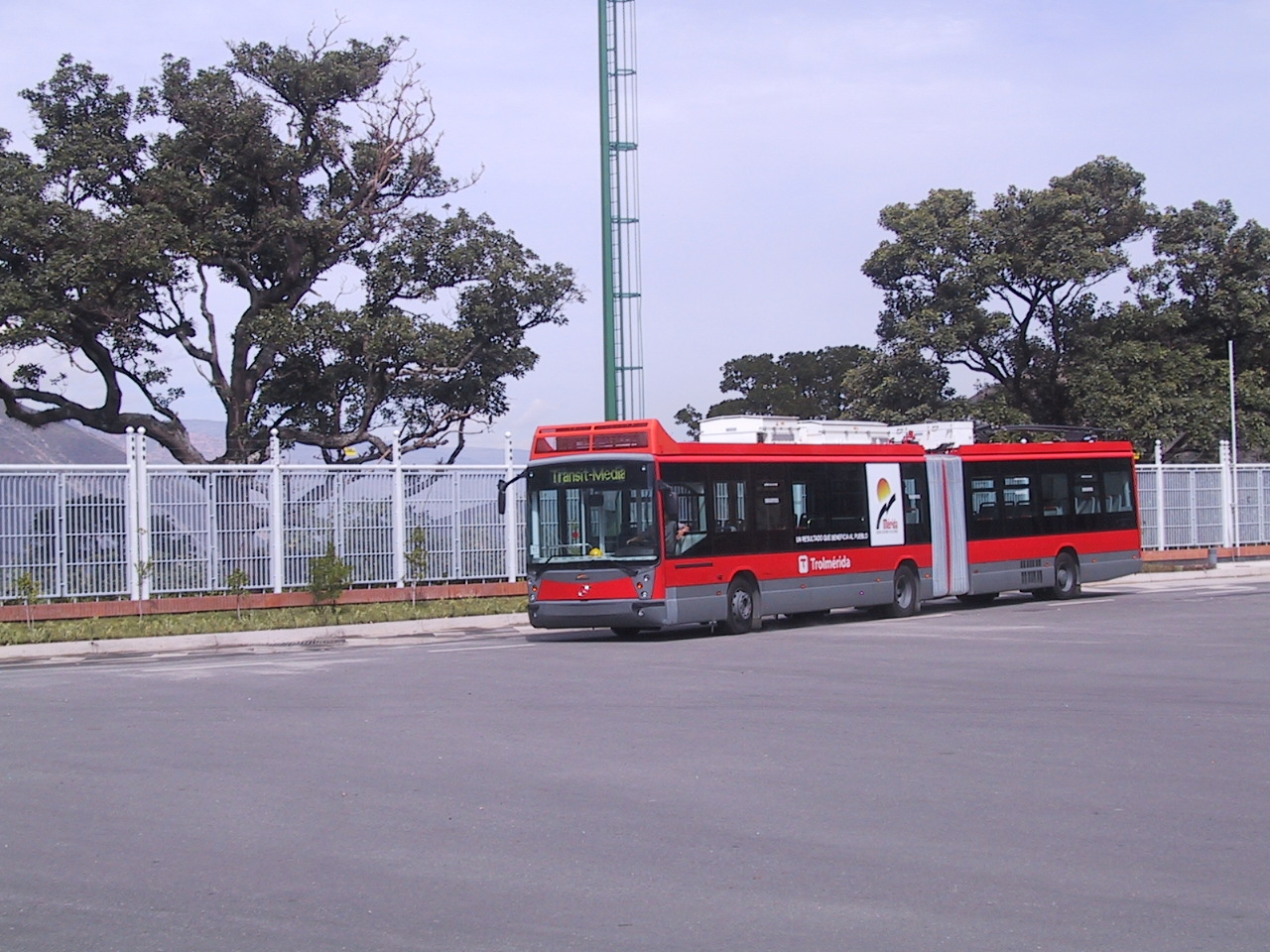

Overview
- Locale: Mérida, Venezuela
- Transit type: Trolleybus; Bus rapid transit
- Number of stations: 22

Operation
- Began operation: 18 June 2007
- Ended operation: c. August 2016 (as trolleybus)
- Operators: Tromerca (Trolebús Mérida, CA)

Technical
- System length: 15.2 km

The Mérida trolleybus system was an electrified bus rapid transit system that served Mérida, Venezuela, and surrounding communities from 2007 to 2016. Its only line, which was operated by dual-mode trolleybuses, was considered to be "Line 1" of a planned three-route "Mass Transport System" (Sistema de Transporte Masivo), of which Line 2 was also to be trolleybus and Line 3 an aerial cableway. Line 3 was originally planned as a funicular, but was changed to a cableway in 2005. Construction of Line 3, the cableway (now named Trolcable), was about 50 percent complete as of May 2011, and the cableway opened for service on 14 December 2012. Construction of Line 2 never started. The operator of the system was originally named Trolmérida, but in August 2009 its name was changed to Tromerca, for Trolebús Mérida, C.A.

The initial 10.4-km route opened in June 2007, and a 2.7-km extension to Mercado Periférico (just southwest of the city centre) opened in September 2012. In August 2015, a 2.1-km extension to Domingo Peña, at the upper terminus of the Line 3 aerial cableway, opened, but with the dual-mode buses running as diesel buses on that section while the overhead wiring awaited installation and, subsequently, certification for use. This brought the length of the trolleybus line to 15.2 km, but with 2.1 km of its length being operated in diesel mode rather than trolleybus mode.

Due to a combination of factors, including electricity rationing and thefts of overhead wiring during periods of civil unrest, diesel buses began to be used on the trolleybus line around June 2015 and by October 2015 they were providing about half of the service. Trolleybus operation became sporadic in 2016. By August, it had ceased entirely, and was not expected to resume.

== Operation ==
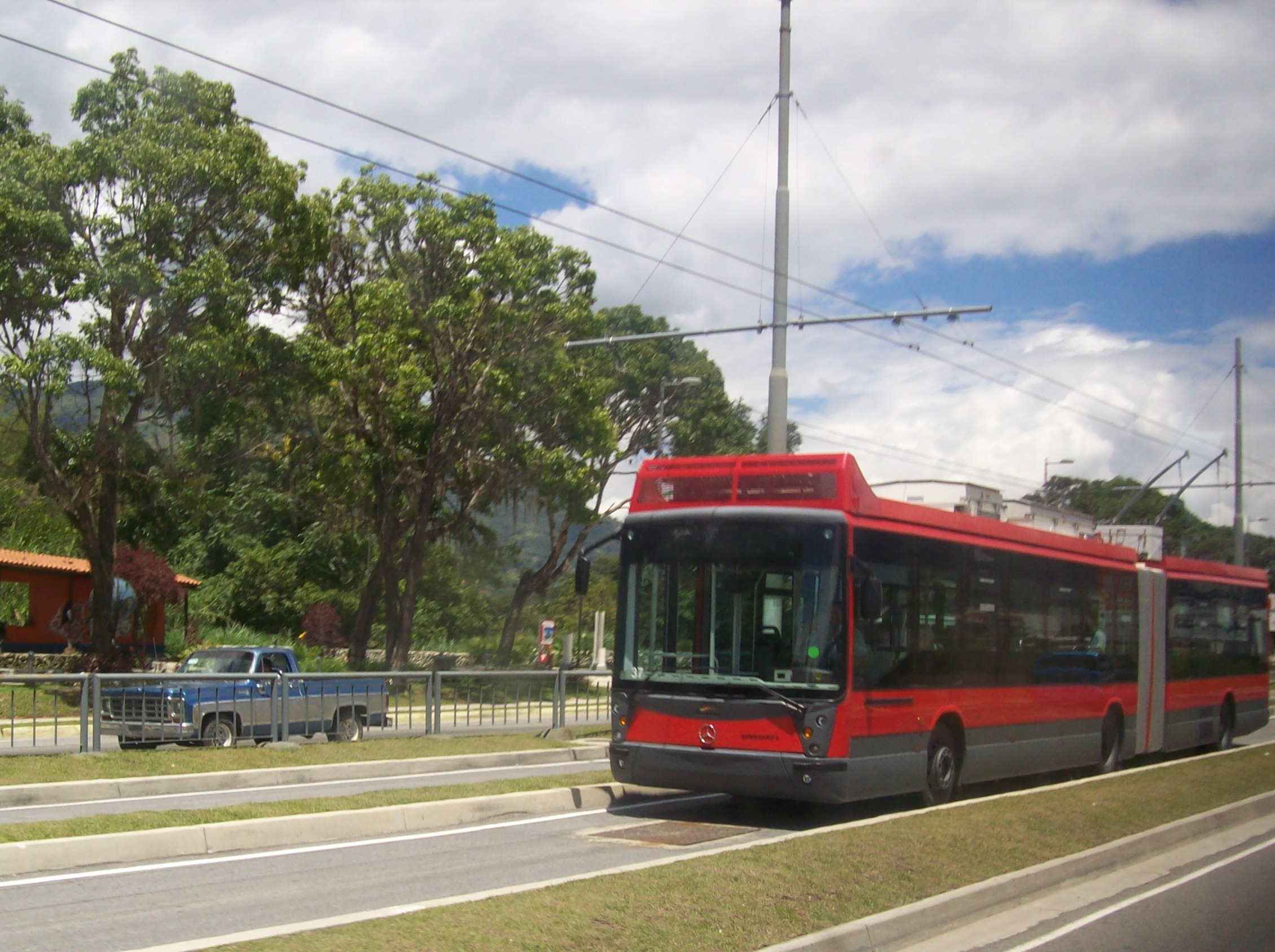
Trolleybus operating in bus-only lane

The trolleybus line was served by a fleet of 45 articulated trolleybuses supplied in 2003 by a partnership of Hispano Carrocera and Mercedes-Benz of Spain, with the vehicles' electrical propulsion equipment provided by Bombardier. Ordered in December 1998, all 45 were delivered in 2003, but construction of the line had fallen behind schedule by then, so the vehicles were stored for an extended period, until the first section of the route was completed. Some of these vehicles were believed to be continuing in service in early 2017, but running exclusively as diesel buses, with all trolleybus operation having ended circa mid-2016.

Like other BRT systems, the vehicles operated in their own exclusive lanes over the route's entire length, to avoid delays from traffic congestion and reduce travel times. Boarding took place at fully enclosed, high-platform stations, permitting quick boarding and alighting of passengers. Similar to many modern light rail and metro systems, the platforms were vertically aligned with the vehicles' floors, and the vehicles had no steps at their doorways. The only previous trolleybus system to use such a system of level boarding at high platforms was El Trole in Quito, Ecuador, and the Mérida system was said to be modeled on the Quito system, which has been very successful.

For most of its life, the trolleybus system was served only in peak periods and during limited hours on weekends, specifically 6 a.m. to 10 a.m. and 4 p.m. to 8 p.m. Monday to Saturday and 11 a.m. to 7 p.m. on Sunday. Weekday off-peak service was only introduced – after repeatedly being postponed – in December 2014. At the same date, Sunday service was discontinued, as the busway began being closed to vehicles every Sunday, for use instead by pedestrians and cyclists, as part of a program called "Healthy Sundays".

All service was also free from its opening in 2007 until December 2014, as the operator had long stated that fares would not be charged until the service was extended to the city centre. The latter did not occur until August 2015, after being repeatedly delayed, so the introduction of fares took place before the line reached the city centre. As with the Quito trolleybus system and other BRT systems, fare collection took place within the stations, before boarding, so that loading could take place via all three vehicle doorways simultaneously.

Diesel buses began providing some of the service on the trolleybus line around June 2015, and by October 2015 they were providing about half of the service. Trolleybus operation became sporadic in 2016, and by around August 2016 all trolleybus operation had ceased, with the few dual-mode buses that remained in service running exclusively in diesel mode. Reasons given included electricity rationing and theft of overhead wiring.

== Line 1 ==
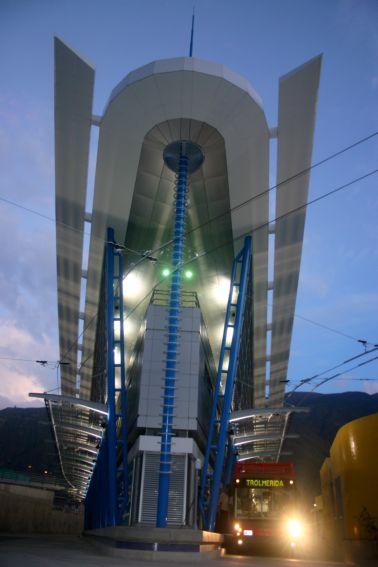
A trolleybus at the Terminal Ejido station, designed by Venezuelan architect Roberto Ameneiro

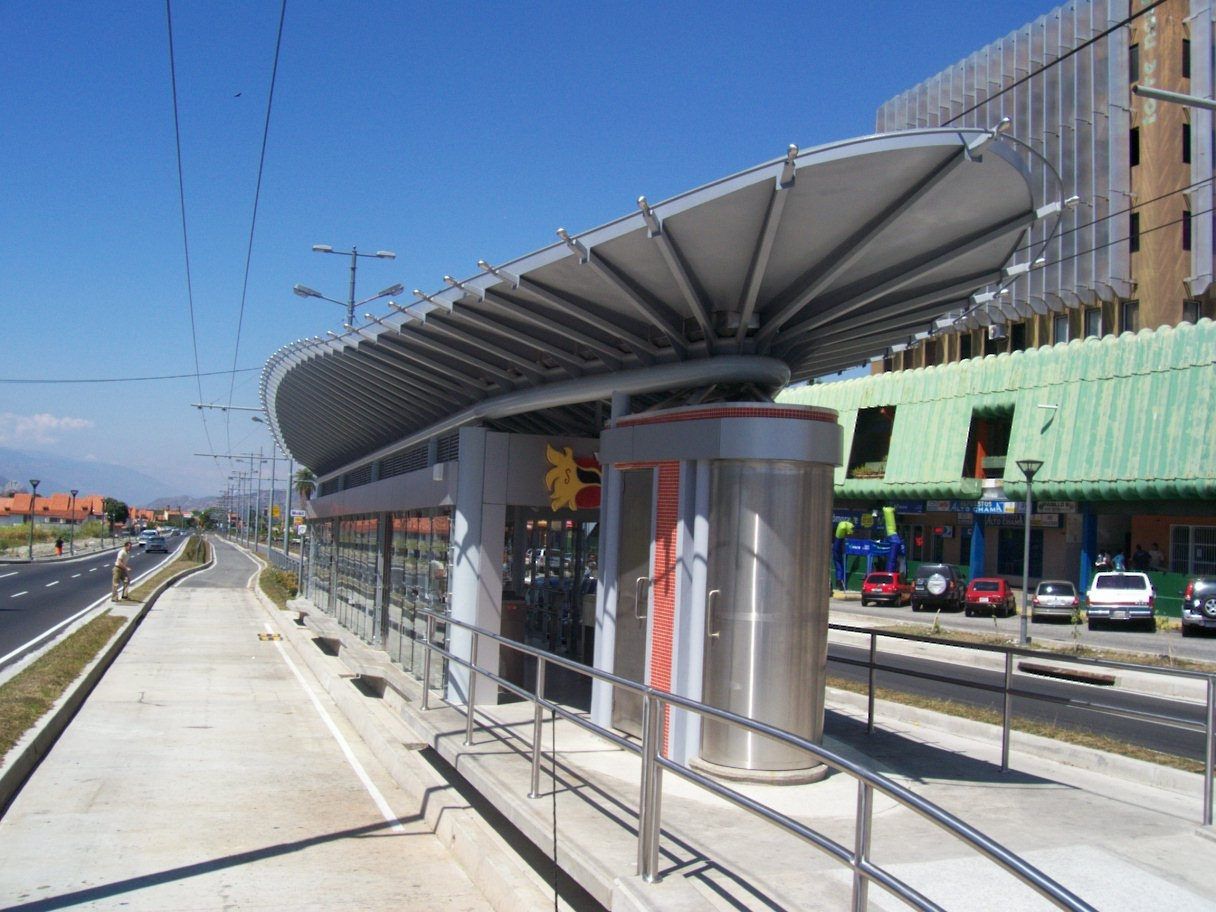
A typical station

The first 10.4-km section, serving 15 stations, was inaugurated on 18 June 2007. The route connected Ejido with Mérida. The northeastern terminus was at Pie del Llano station, southwest of Mérida city centre. Construction continued, somewhat sporadically, on the section of the line extending northeastwards from there, into the city centre.

In September 2012, service was extended from Pie del Llano northeastwards to Mercado Periférico, adding 2.7 km and six stations. The latter was a temporary terminus, pending the opening of the next extension, and was not equipped with overhead wires; the trolleybuses switched to their diesel engines to turn around at Mercado Periférico terminus. This brought the line's length to 13.1 km. Construction continued on the extension from there to a new terminus at the upper end of the also-under-construction aerial cableway (Line 3), which was to be named Los Conquistadores (but was later renamed Domingo Peña).

On 29 August 2015, Line 1 was extended by 2.1 km from Mercado Periférico to Domingo Peña, at the upper end of the cableway, which had opened in December 2014. However, the dual-mode buses operated in diesel mode between Mercado Periférico and Domingo Peña, as the overhead trolley wires along the latter section had not yet been installed. Installation of the overhead wiring began in September and was completed in November, but that wiring never came into use, the trolleybuses continuing to operate in diesel mode along that 2-km section. Diesel buses began providing some of the service on Line 1 in 2015, and by around August 2016 all trolleybus operation had ceased, with the few dual-mode buses remaining in service running exclusively in diesel mode.

=== Line 1 stations ===
The following stations were in operation in 2015, the last full year of trolleybus operation:

- Terminal Ejido
- Pozo Hondo
- Centenario
- Montalbán
- Las Cruces
- Pan de Azúcar
- La Parroquia (proposed Line 2 transfer point)
- La Mara
- Alto Chama
- Carrizal
- Museo de Ciencias
- Las Tapias
- El Acuario
- San Antonio
- Pie del Llano.
- Santa Juana
- Soto Rosa
- María Mazzarello
- Campo de Oro
- Juan XXIII
- Mercado Periférico
- (not yet open in 2015, being passed without stopping): Luis Ghersi Govea
- (not yet open in 2015, being passed without stopping): Medicina
- (not yet open in 2015, being passed without stopping): Universidad
- Domingo Peña (upper terminus of Line 3 aerial cableway)

== Line 2 (former plan) ==
Line 2, the second trolleybus route, never got past the planning stages. It was expected to be 12 km long with three common stations alongside or crossing Line 1. It would have connected La Parroquia with La Vuelta de Lola, running along streets parallel to Line 1 for much of its length.

== Line 3 ==
Line 3, the aerial cableway, connects San Jacinto, in the Chama River valley below the city, to an upper terminus in central Mérida and is about 1 km long. It opened for service on 14 December 2012.

On 29 August 2015, the service on Line 1 (the trolleybus line) was extended to the upper end of the cableway, where its new terminus station was named Domingo Peña. However, the dual-mode buses operated in diesel mode between Mercado Periférico and Domingo Peña, as the overhead trolley wires along the latter section had not yet been installed.

== In fiction ==
Trolleybuses in Lusaka uses Tromerca Mercedes-Benz Hispano dual-mode trolleybus in Bus Simulator 16.

== See also ==
- List of trolleybus systems
- Bus rapid transit
