= BusCaracas =

Bus rapid transit system

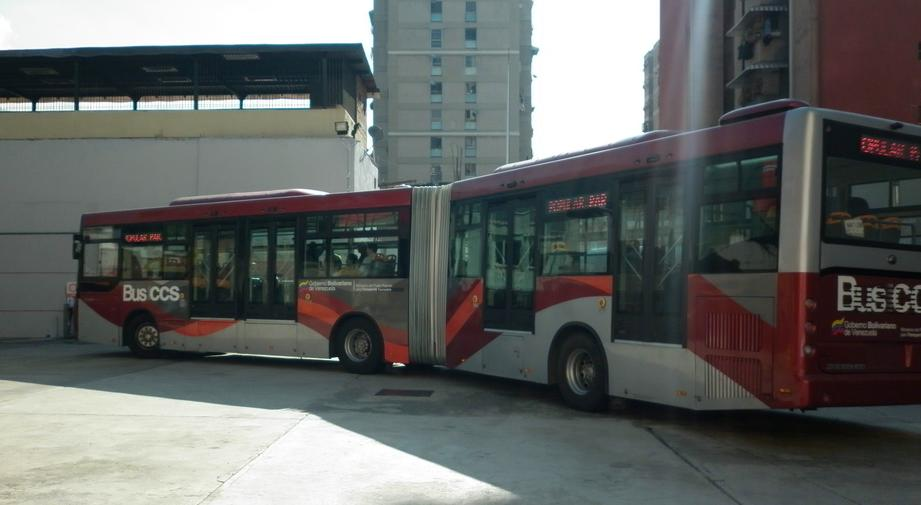

Overview
- Locale: Caracas, Venezuela
- Transit type: bus rapid transit
- Number of stations: 11
- Daily ridership: 30000

Operation
- Began operation: October 2012
- Operator: Metro de Caracas C.A.

Technical
- System length: 5.2 KM (3.2 miles)

The BusCaracas is a bus rapid transit system that serves Caracas, the capital of Venezuela. The system opened to the public in October 2012 , covering San José de Cotiza, La Bandera and El Cementerio. Other lines have been added gradually over the next several years.

== Stations ==
- Las Flores
- Panteón
- Socorro
- La Hoyada (With transfer to line 1 of Caracas Metro)
- El Cristo
- Roca Tarpeya
- Presidente Medina
- El INCES
- Roosevelt
- La Bandera (With transfer to line 3 of Caracas Metro)
- Los Ilustres
