= Line 3 (Metrovía) =

Bus route in Guayaquil, Ecuador

Line 3 of Metrovia was inaugurated on May 4, 2008. It connects the populous neighborhood of Bastion Popular at the north of Guayaquil with downtown.

== Stations ==
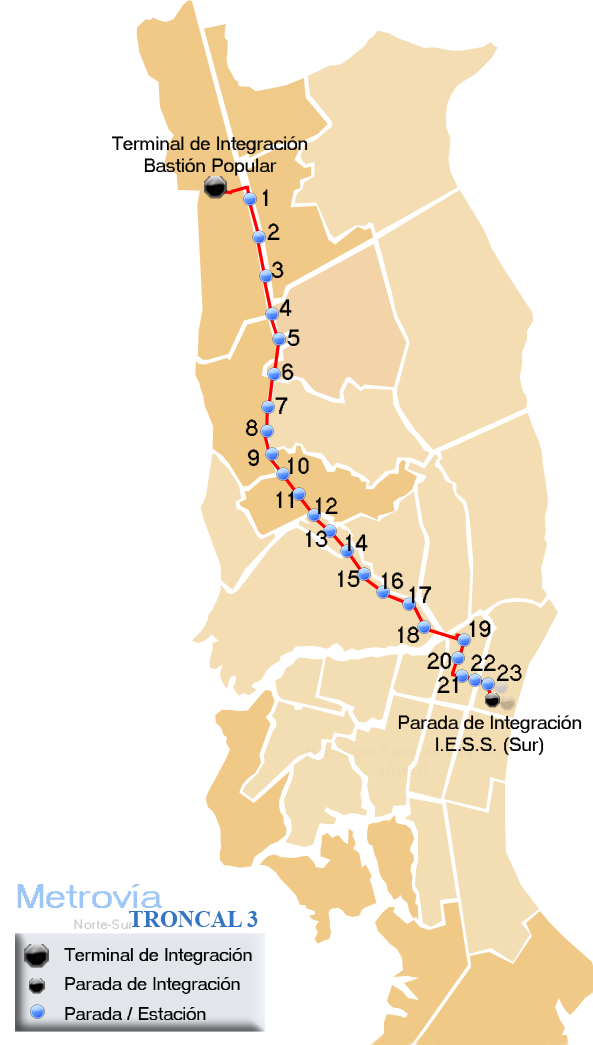
Guayaquil's BRT System - Metovia; Stations from North to South
Number	Name of Station
	Main Terminal - Bastión Popular
1	Parque California
2	Inmaconsa
3	Coop. Luz del Guayas
4	Fuerte Huancavilca
5	La Florida
6	Coop. Gallegos Lara
7	Avenida Juan Tanca Marengo
8	Prosperina
9	Colegio Dores Sucre
10	Cerros de Mapasingue
11	Mapasingue
12	Centro de Arte
13	Fedeguayas
14	Colegio 28 de Mayo
15	Avenida Las Monjas
16	Ciudadela Bellavista
17	Universidad Católica
18	Ciudadela Ferroviaria
19	Universidad de Guayaquil
20	Colegio Vicente Rocafuerte
21	Calle Esmeraldas
22	Plaza La Victoria
23	Mercado Central
	Main Terminal I.E.S.S. (South)

== See also ==
- Metrovia BRT System
- Line 1 of Metrovia
