= Trolleybuses in Quito =

Bus rapid transit system in Quito, Ecuador

Quito trolleybus system

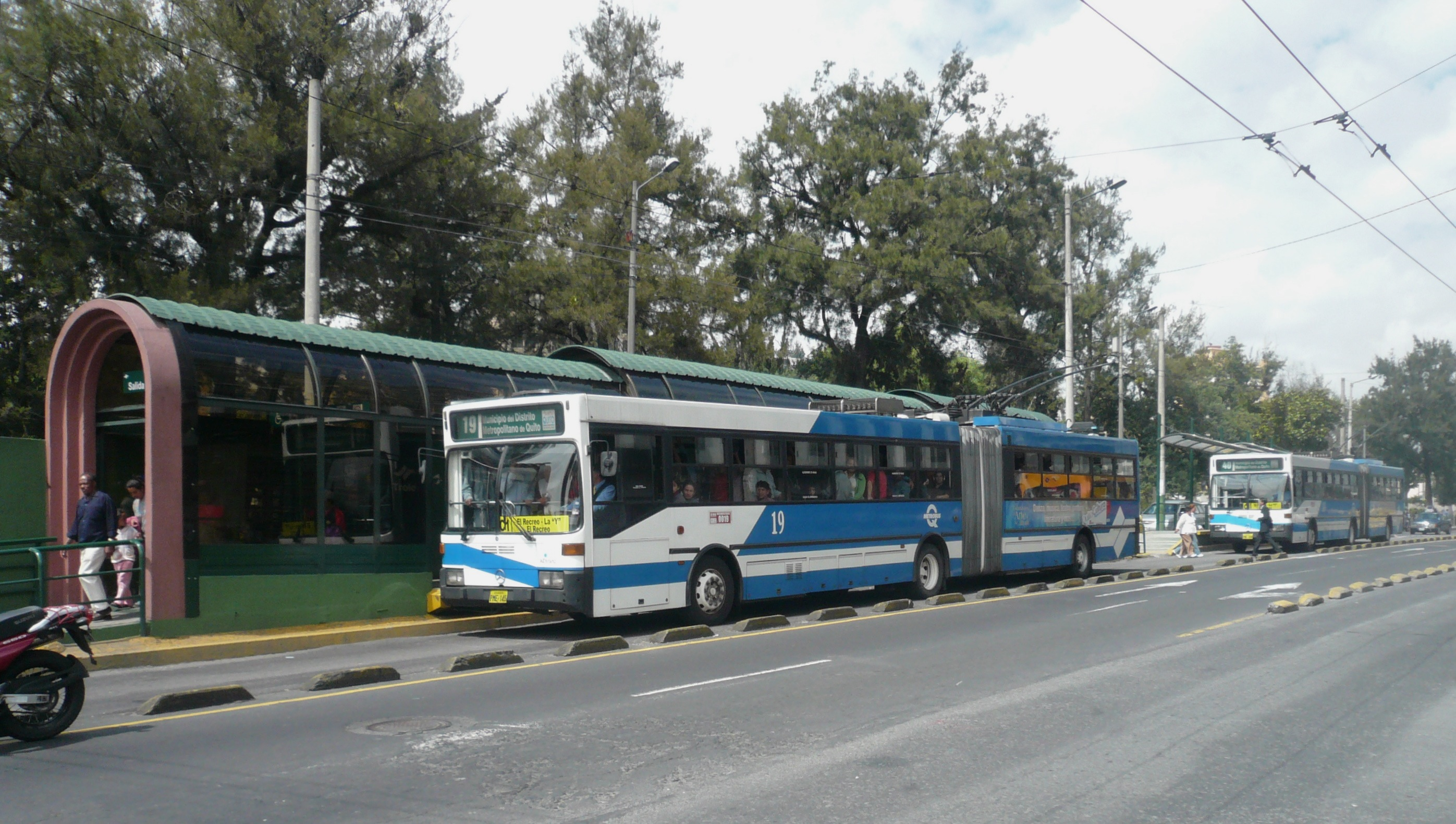
- A trolleybus stopped at one of the high-platform stations typical of the line

Operation
- Locale: Quito, Ecuador
- Open: 18 December 1995
- Status: Open

Infrastructure
- Electrification: 750 V DC

Statistics
- Route length: 20 km (12 mi)

The Quito trolleybus system is a bus rapid transit line located in Quito, Ecuador, which opened in 1995 and by 2002 was carrying approximately 220,000 passengers per day. It is managed by an agency of the municipality known as Empresa Metropolitana de Servicios y Administración del Transporte (EMSAT) and is operated by Compañía Trolebús Quito, S.A. The service is named (informally) El Trole, Spanish for "The Trolley", meaning trolleybus; this name is shown on signage at stops, and is used in publicity and marketing. Before being a subsystem of a larger bus rapid transit system of Quito known as MetrobusQ, El Trole was itself a whole system. Its formal name is Corredor Trole or; simply Trole, currently.

== The route ==
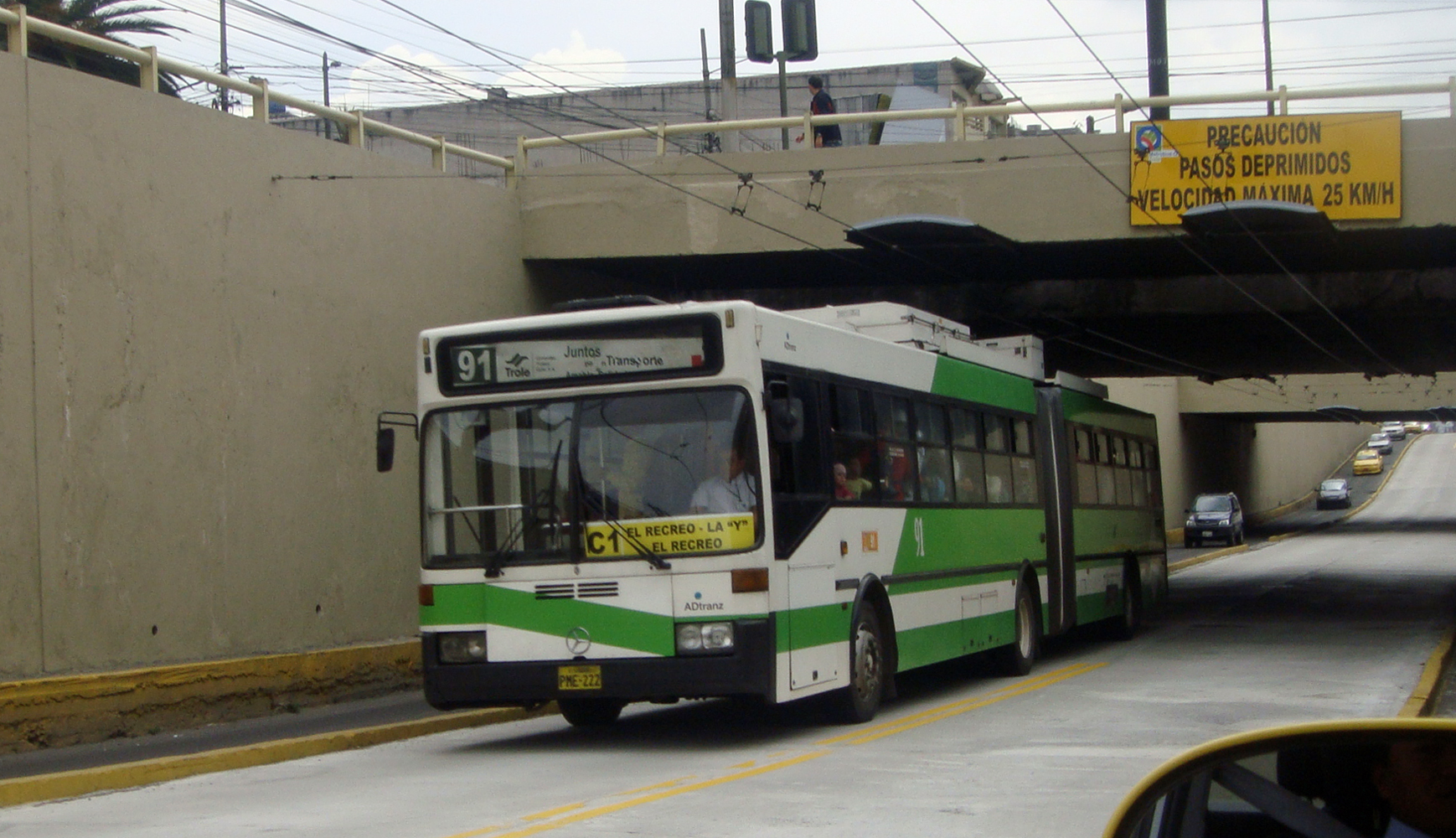
The streets used by the BRT lanes have grade-separated crossings in a few places.

The trolleybus system is composed of a single 18.7 km (11.6 mi) line that runs, with a few exceptions, through the part of Ecuador Highway 35 (E 35) that is within Quito. The three segments of E 35 inside Quito are Avenida Diez de Agosto (northern Quito), Calle Guayaquil (center of Quito) and Avenida Pedro Vicente Maldonado (south of Quito). Seven different passenger services, or circuitos, are operated along the trolleybus route, differing in their terminus locations but overlapping one another. By at least mid-1998, trolleybuses had begun displaying large printed cards in their front windows, reading C1, C2, or C3, to distinguish the then-three circuitos in operation.

The initial 11.2 km (7.0 mi) line opened in three stages between 18 December 1995 and 21 April 1996, and connected the La "Y" district, in northern Quito and near Old Mariscal Sucre International Airport, to the El Recreo shopping mall (Centro Comercial El Recreo), in southern Quito, via the city center. On 30 April 2000, the line was extended south by 4.9 km (3.0 mi) to Morán Valverde. Some trips continued to end at El Recreo. The bus lanes on the El Recreo–Morán Valverde section are located in the middle of the street, instead of at the sides like most previous route sections and, unusually, this section was built with island platforms and trolleybuses running left-hand so that their right-side doors would serve the central station platforms.

On 19 December 2008, the line was extended farther south and east, by 2.5 km (1.6 mi), from Morán Valverde to Quitumbe,^{(ES)} where it terminates at a large new intercity-bus station. The new section continued the left-hand-running configuration. This 2008 extension brought the length of the full line to 18.7 km (11.6 mi). At the opposite end of the route, the service was extended on 1 June 2018 by 1.5 kilometres (0.9 mi) from Terminal Norte La "Y" to a new bus station named "El Labrador", but with the trolleybuses initially covering the new section in diesel mode, because the overhead wiring was not yet usable. This increased the overall length of the route to 20 km (12 mi). By January 2019, trolleybuses had begun using the trolley wires on the new section to El Labrador. The 1996-opened Terminal Norte bus station closed when the service was extended, and was to be demolished.

Between the Machángara River and the Villa Flora stop, the line originally followed separate streets in opposite directions: southbound along Avenida Cardenal Carlos Maria de la Torre (now Jaime del Castillo) and northbound along Avenida Maldonado, but the section along Cardenal de la Torre was closed in December 2003 (having already been unserved by trolleybuses since April 2002, because of a construction-related diversion), and the route thereafter has followed Avenida Maldonado in both directions along that section, reducing the length of the southbound route by about 0.2 km.

In May 2015, a new semi-express service C5 was introduced, running from Parque El Ejido, in the city centre, to Estación Norte and then branching off the main route and running northwards to Terminal Carcelén,^{(ES)} another new bus station. However, the 8.7-kilometre-long (5.4 mi) new section was entirely along streets lacking overhead wires, and the trolleybuses cover it in diesel mode.

In May 2016, trolleybus service between El Recreo and Quitumbe ceased, because officials wanted to discontinue the unusual left-hand operation on that section, and that change – to right-hand running – made it impossible for the trolleybuses to serve the island platforms at most stops, given that they have doors only on their right side. That section of the "trolleybus" line then became served only by diesel buses equipped with doors on both sides, which had already been providing some of the service there since at least March 2015. However, some trolleybus trips to Morán Valverde soon resumed, but running semi-express on that 5 km (3.1 mi) section, serving only one stop, España, the only station on that section to have side platforms. Trolleybus service between Morán Valverde and Quitumbe was not reinstated at that time, although diesel buses running on the "trolleybus" (El Trole) service continued to serve that section, but eventually trolleybuses resumed operating to Quitumbe.

== Operation ==
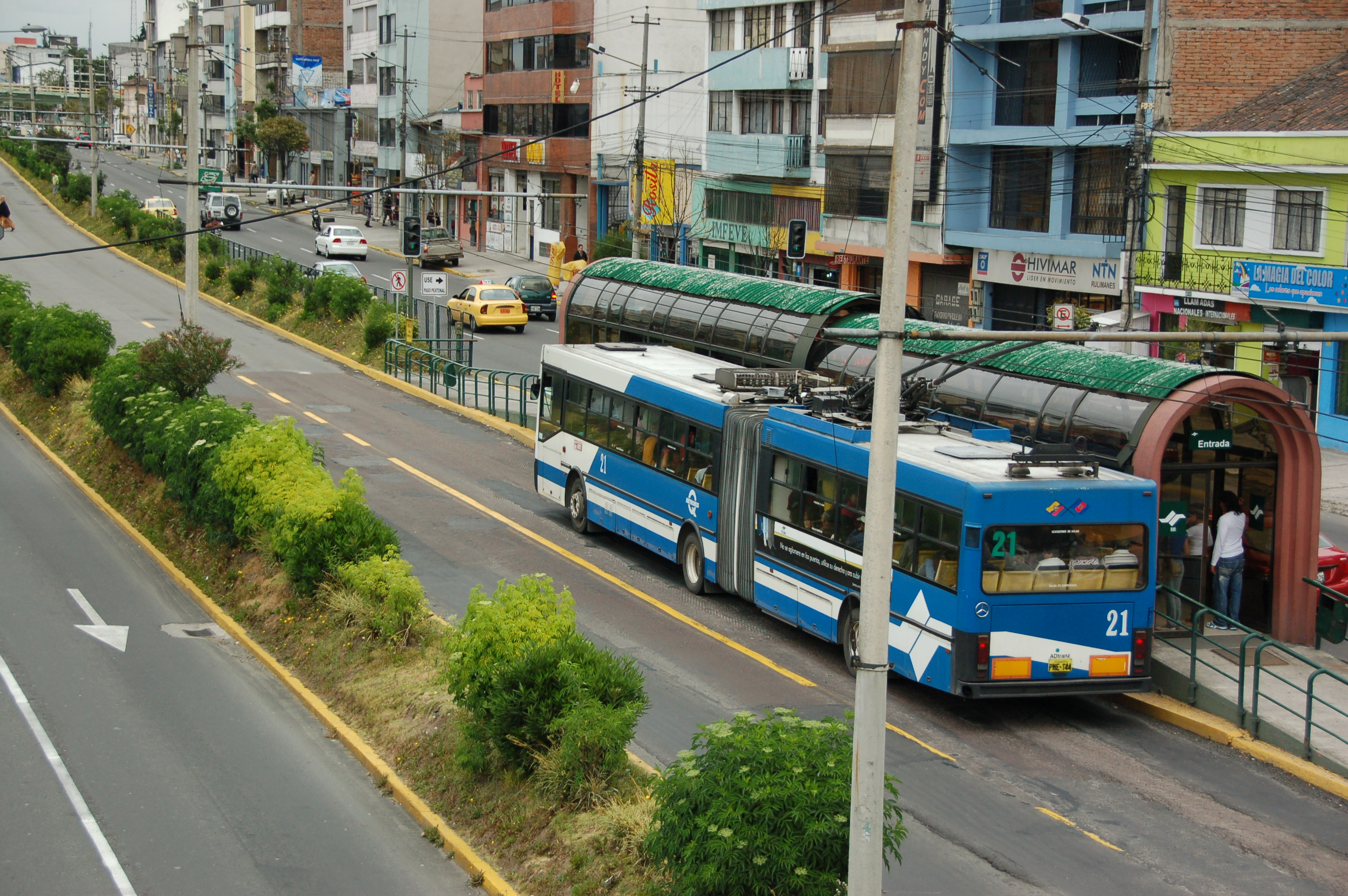
A trolleybus at the Estadio station, in the trolleybus-only lanes of Avenida 10 de Agosto

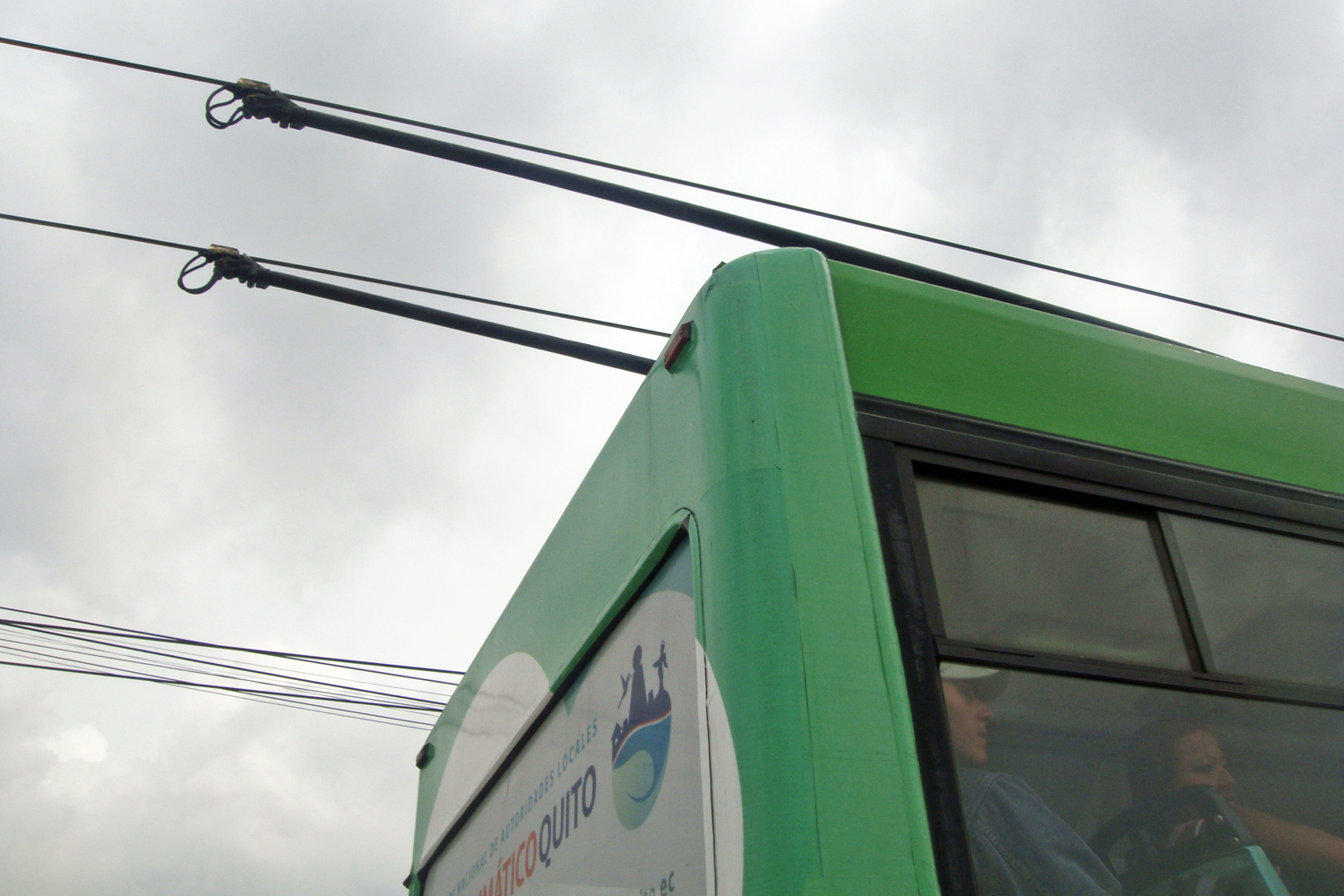
Detail view of the ends of the trolley poles and trolley-heads on the catenary or overhead lines

Service is provided by a fleet of 113 articulated trolleybuses, built by Hispano Carrocera and Mercedes-Benz, with electrical equipment by Kiepe Elektrik and AEG/Adtranz. For the first phase, 54 vehicles were delivered in 1995–96. Another 59 very similar vehicles were delivered in 1999–2000 for the system's expansion.

The line operates in dedicated trolleybus-only lanes over almost its entire length, and the trolleybuses are given traffic-signal priority at most intersections. Large terminals, called Estaciones, are located at the line's two original termini, Estación Norte La "Y" and Estación Sur El Recreo, and also at Morán Valverde and Quitumbe. In between these large terminals are many smaller stations, known as paradas (or "stops"), spaced about 550 meters apart, on average. In addition to the traffic separation and signal priority, other features of El Trole intended to facilitate fast service—and making the operation similar to many light rail lines—include the arrangements at stops:

- All fare collection takes place off of the vehicles, and the boarding area is a "paid area", to which passengers are given access (via turnstiles) only upon paying (to a ticket machine or agent) or showing a prepaid fare instrument such as a monthly pass. This allows boarding and alighting to take place simultaneously at all three doorways of each vehicle.
- All stops have high-level boarding platforms that are vertically aligned with the floors of the trolleybuses, allowing level, step-free boarding. The vehicles are equipped at each doorway with bridge plates that fold down at stops, to bridge the gap between the vehicle and the platform.

The scheduled service frequency is very high at most times, over most of the line, with the headways/intervals being as short as 60 seconds during peak periods. All four of the major Estaciones (transfer terminals) are served by several suburban bus routes, "feeding" the trolleybus line, and transfers made there are free.

The original operator of El Trole was a department of the municipal government known as Unidad Operadora del Sistema Trolebús (UOST), but around March 2008 operation was transferred to Compañía Trolebús Quito S.A., a newly formed private company that is believed to be still municipally owned.

By January 2017, only 47 of the 113 trolleybuses, delivered in 1995–2000, were in serviceable condition, and the service on El Trole was a mix of trolleybuses and diesel buses, but 40 others were undergoing refurbishment or awaiting repair; the remaining 26 had been sold for scrap. Diesel buses had already been providing some of the service for at least a few years, as the oldest trolleybuses became less reliable, mostly on express trips but increasingly also on ordinary trips. By 2021, 60 trolleybuses were reported to be serviceable. In 2024, an order for 50 new trolleybuses was placed with Yutong, of China, and was soon expanded to 60 vehicles. The first unit was delivered on 18 January 2025, and all but 14 of the others arrived in March 2025. Those 46 new Yutong trolleybuses entered service on 31 March 2025, replacing most of the remaining Mercedes-Benz vehicles. The last 14 were delivered in April and entered service in mid-June, replacing the last of the older trolleybuses. It was planned that Nos. 01 and 99 would be preserved. The Yutong trolleybuses introduced a new paint scheme, of blue with striping in red and light blue, based on the colours of the flag of Quito.

== Stop locations ==
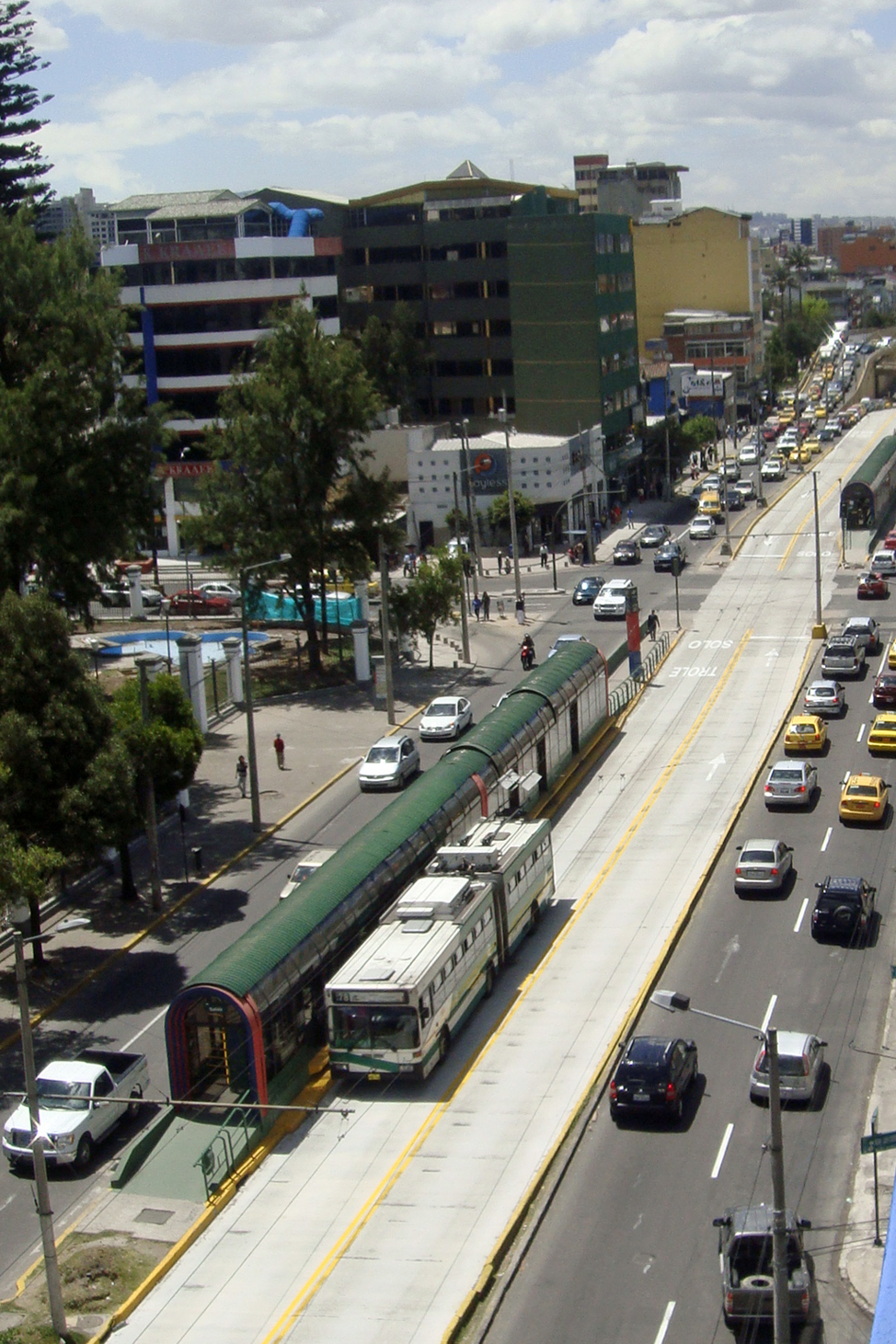
Typical station north of the city centre, with busway placed in the median and the northbound and southbound platforms offset. This is Colón station, on Avenida 10 de Agosto.

These are the stations and stops of the trolleybus line and the street intersections where they are located:

Avenida 10 de Agosto:

- Estación Norte - La "Y": Av. 10 de Agosto y Cofanes
- Parada La "Y": Av. 10 de Agosto y Pereira
- Parada Estadio (Estadio Olímpico Atahualpa): Avs. 10 de Agosto y Naciones Unidas
- Parada La Carolina: Avs. 10 de Agosto y República
- Parada Florón: Av. 10 de Agosto y Rumipamba
- Parada Mariana de Jesús: Avs. 10 de Agosto y Mariana de Jesús
- Parada Cuero y Caicedo: Av. 10 de Agosto y Cuero y Caicedo
- Parada Colón: Avs. 10 de Agosto y Colón
- Parada Santa Clara: Av. 10 de Agosto y Veintimilla
- Parada Mariscal: Av. 10 de Agosto y Jorge Washington
- Parada Ejido: Av. 10 de Agosto y Bogotá
- Parada La Alameda: Av. 10 de Agosto y Ante
- Parada Banco Central (Banco Central del Ecuador): Av. 10 de Agosto y Caldas (southbound only)
- Parada San Blas (northbound only): Calle Montúfar y Guayaquil

Within the Centro Histórico:

- Parada Plaza del Teatro: southbound stop at Guayaquil y Manabí, northbound stop at Montúfar y Manabí
- Parada Plaza Grande: Guayaquil y Espejo (southbound only)
- Parada Santo Domingo: Guayaquil y Rocafuerte

Avenida Maldonado:

- Parada Cumandá: Avs. Maldonado y 24 de Mayo
- Parada Recoleta: Av. Maldonado y la Exposición
- Parada Jefferson Pérez: Av. Maldonado y El Sena (at the Machángara River crossing) (southbound only)
- Parada Colina: Av. Maldonado y Alpahausi (northbound only)
- Parada Chimbacalle: Av. Maldonado near the terminal station of the Guayaquil & Quito Railway
- Parada Villa Flora: Av. Maldonado y Ernesto Terán
- Estación Sur El Recreo: Av. Maldonado y Rivas

Along the route extensions opened in 2000 and 2008, mostly along Av. Hugo Ortiz, Av. Quitumbe Ñan and Av. Cóndor Ñan:

- Parada Calzado
- Parada España
- Parada Quito Sur
- Parada Internacional
- Parada Ajaví
- Parada Solanda
- Parada Mercado Mayorista
- Parada Quimiag
- Parada Registro Civil
- Estación Morán Valverde
- Parada Amaru Ñan
- Parada Cóndor Ñan
- Estación Quitumbe
