= MetrobusQ =

Bus rapid transit system in Ecuador

MetrobusQ

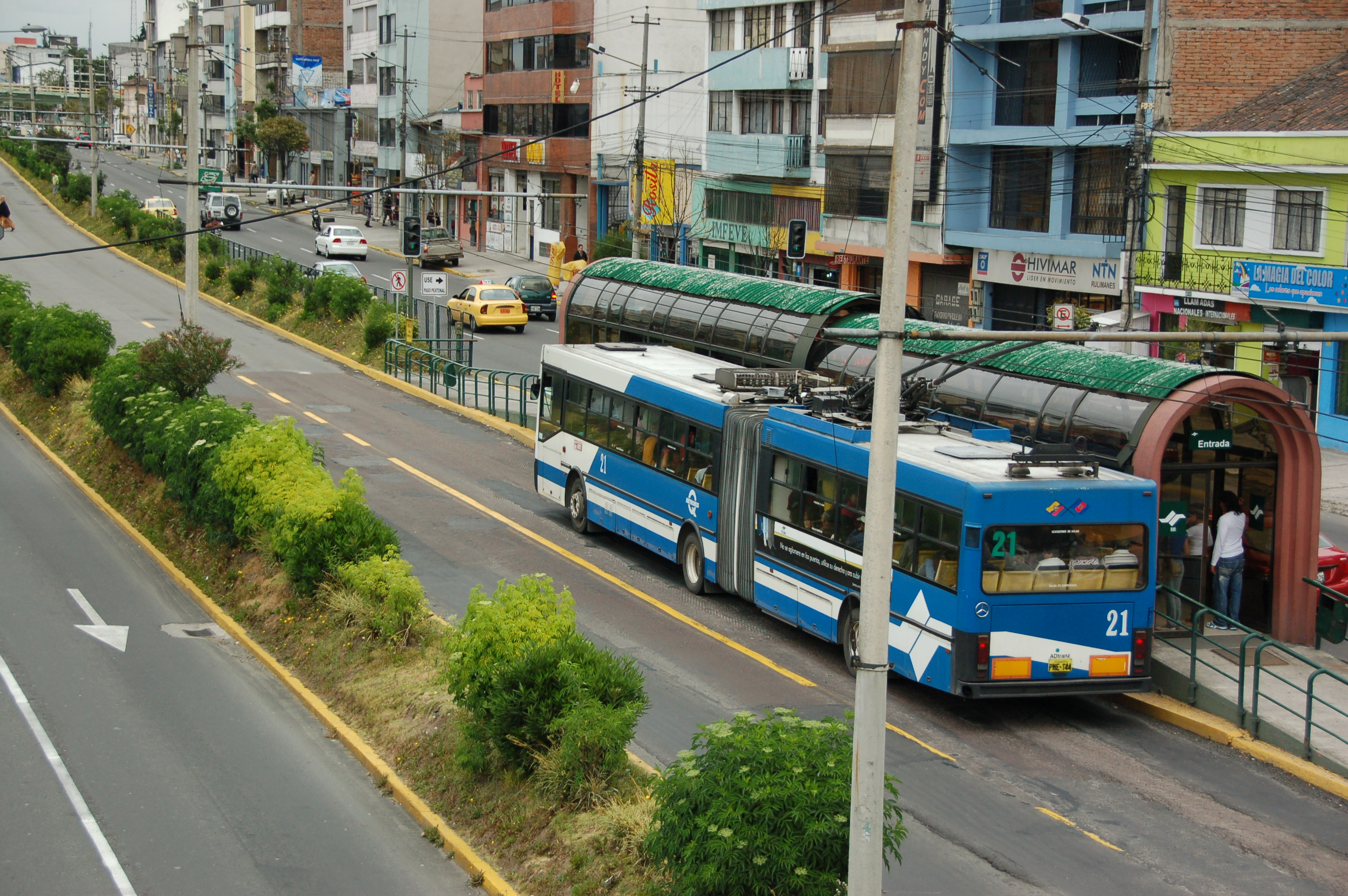
A trolleybus at the "Estadio" station of the Quito trolleybus system, on Avenida 10 de Agosto.

MetrobusQ or Sistema MetrobusQ (the name is short for Metrobús (de) Quito) is a bus rapid transit system managed by the Empresa Metropolitana de Servicios y Administración del Transporte (EMSAT), the transportation agency of the municipality of the city of Quito, Pichincha Province, Ecuador. It is composed of three subsystems, or three busways:

- Trolleybus system ("Trole"), opened in 1995 and subsequently extended.
- Articulated bus line ("Ecovía"), opened in 2001.
- Articulated bus line ("Metrobus") running through northern and central Quito ("Corredor Central Norte").
