= Empresa Metropolitana de Servicios y Administración del Transporte =

Empresa Metropolitana de Servicios y Administración del Transporte (EMSAT)

Overview
- Owner: Government agency of the municipality of Quitor, Ecuador
- Locale: Quito, Ecuador
- Transit type: Bus rapid transit
- Number of lines: MetrobusQ (main bus line)
- Headquarters: Quito, Ecuador
- Website: quito.gob.ec, official website of municipality of Quito, Ecuador (in Spanish)

Operation
- Began operation: July 13, 2001

Empresa Metropolitana de Servicios y Administración del Transporte or EMSAT (Metropolitan Transport Services and Administration Company) is the transportation government agency of the municipality of Quito, the capital of Ecuador.

== Origins ==
Formerly known as the UPGT (Transportation Planning and Management Unit), after requests from the mayor of Quito, the Metropolitan Council decided to change its name to the Metropolitan Transport Services and Administration (EMSAT). This was a joint venture, mostly formed through public funds and an intention to be autonomous in its financial management. With the passing of time this company was managed by Mr. Rodrigo Torres who had to leave the administration of this company due to alleged cases of corruption when managing the management of the "Ecovia". Its Director of Operations, Mr. Bolivar Muñoz, has expressed his effort and sacrifice in favor of the development of this former company of the Municipality.

== Operations ==
Its function is to manage the bus system in and around the city. Quito's main bus system is known as MetrobusQ.

== See also ==
- List of bus companies
