= Saint-Max =

- Commune
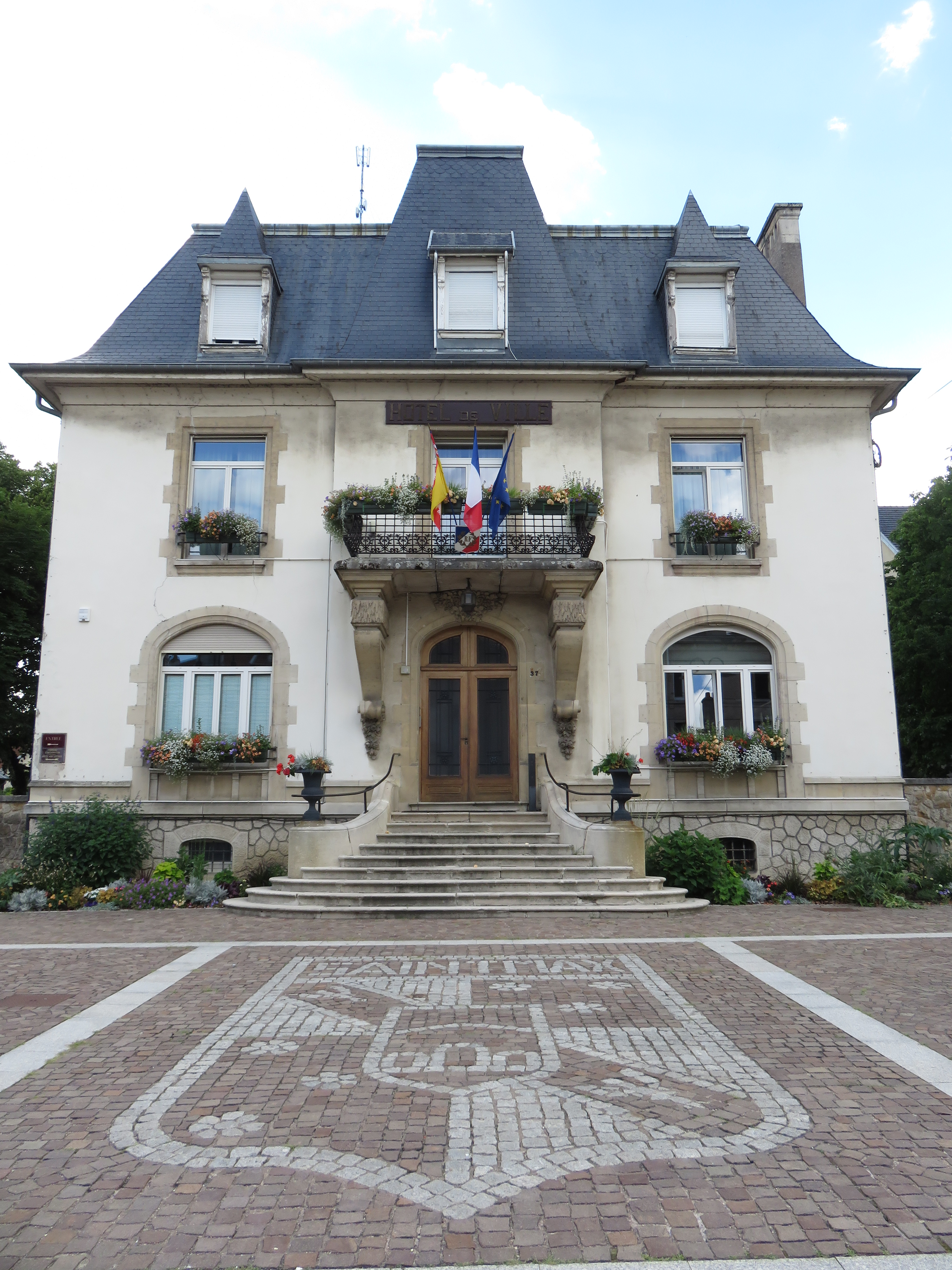
- Saint-Max City Hall

- Coat of arms
- Location of Saint-Max
- Location within France Location within Grand Est
- Coordinates: 48°42′06″N 6°12′26″E
- Country: France
- Region: Grand Est
- Department: Meurthe-et-Moselle
- Arrondissement: Nancy
- Canton: Saint-Max
- Intercommunality: Métropole du Grand Nancy

Government
  - Mayor (2020–2026): Eric Pensalfini
- Area^{1}: 1.85 km^{2} (0.71 sq mi)
- Highest elevation: 342 m (1,122 ft)
- Lowest elevation: 193 m (633 ft)
- Population (2023): 9,913
  - Density: 5,360/km^{2} (13,900/sq mi)
- Time zone: UTC+01:00 (CET)
  - Summer (DST): UTC+02:00 (CEST)
- INSEE/Postal code: 54482 /54130
- ^{1} French Land Register data, which excludes lakes, ponds, glaciers > 1 km^{2} (0.386 sq mi or 247 acres) and river estuaries.

Saint-Max (French pronunciation: [sɛ̃ maks]) is a commune in the Meurthe-et-Moselle department in north-eastern France.

== Geography ==
The city of Saint-Max is located in north-eastern France, a suburb of Nancy. The surrounding communities are: Nancy, Essey-lès-Nancy, Tomblaine, Dommartemont and Malzéville. Since 2016, it is part of the Métropole du Grand Nancy.

== Population ==
Historical population
Year	Pop.	±% p.a.
1968	12,489	—
1975	12,463	−0.03%
1982	11,656	−0.95%
1990	11,075	−0.64%
1999	10,939	−0.14%
2007	10,050	−1.05%
2012	9,642	−0.83%
2017	9,965	+0.66%
2023	9,913	−0.09%
Source: INSEE

== Places and monuments ==
The Chateau du Pont de Meurthe is a beautiful large mansion of Napoleon III that completed in 1874. One can admire, among others, a beautiful stone staircase with a wrought iron railing and a carved wood fireplace. By 1955, it became the property of the city and has hosted successive CREPS, college, general education, a physical rehabilitation centre school. In 1976, the library moved there. In 1990, it was the turn of the school music.

== See also ==
- Communes of the Meurthe-et-Moselle department
