= Lists of bus rapid transit systems =

List of bus rapid transit systems may refer to:

- List of bus rapid transit systems in Africa
- List of bus rapid transit systems in Asia and the Pacific
- List of bus rapid transit systems in Europe
- List of bus rapid transit systems in North America
- List of bus rapid transit systems in Oceania
- List of bus rapid transit systems in South America
