= Arboretum de l'Abiétinée =

Arboretum in Meurthe-et-Moselle, Lorraine, France

Coordinates: 48°42′30″N 6°11′41″E

The Arboretum de l'Abiétinée (French pronunciation: [aʁbɔʁetɔm də labjetine]; 1.5 hectares) is an arboretum located between Rue Pasteur and the Grand Allée in Malzéville, Meurthe-et-Moselle, Lorraine, France. The garden is strongly linked to the history of French Art Nouveau but currently unmaintained.

The private arboretum was created in 1902 by Eugène Schott, mayor of Malzéville and also vice president of the Société centrale d'horticulture de Nancy. Emile Gallé, a major force in the French Art Nouveau movement, concurrently served as the society's president, and the nearby Cure d'Air Trianon was, like the arboretum, designed in the Art Nouveau style. Horticulturist and conifer specialist Victor Didier designed and led planting of the garden, whose name reflects the society's interest in fir trees (Abies).

According to a document by Didier, published in 1910, the garden contained 25 genera and 277 taxa of conifers, as well as a number of other woody plants. It received honors for its conifer collection in the years 1904-1913, but the property changed hands several times subsequently as the arboretum fell into disuse. As of 2006 it was in danger of loss to development, and efforts were underway to save and restore it.

== See also ==
- List of botanical gardens in France
