= Canton of Saint-Max =

Canton in Grand Est, France

Coordinates: 48.70°N 6.21°E

The canton of Saint-Max is an administrative division of the Meurthe-et-Moselle department, northeastern France. Its borders were modified at the French canton reorganisation which came into effect in March 2015. Its seat is in Saint-Max.

It consists of the following communes:

1. Dommartemont
2. Essey-lès-Nancy
3. Malzéville
4. Saint-Max
5. Tomblaine
