= List of bus rapid transit systems in Europe =

The term bus rapid transit system (BRT system) has been applied to a wide range of bus, trolleybus, and electric bus systems. In 2012, the Institute for Transportation and Development Policy (ITDP) published a BRT Standard to make it easier to standardize and compare bus services.

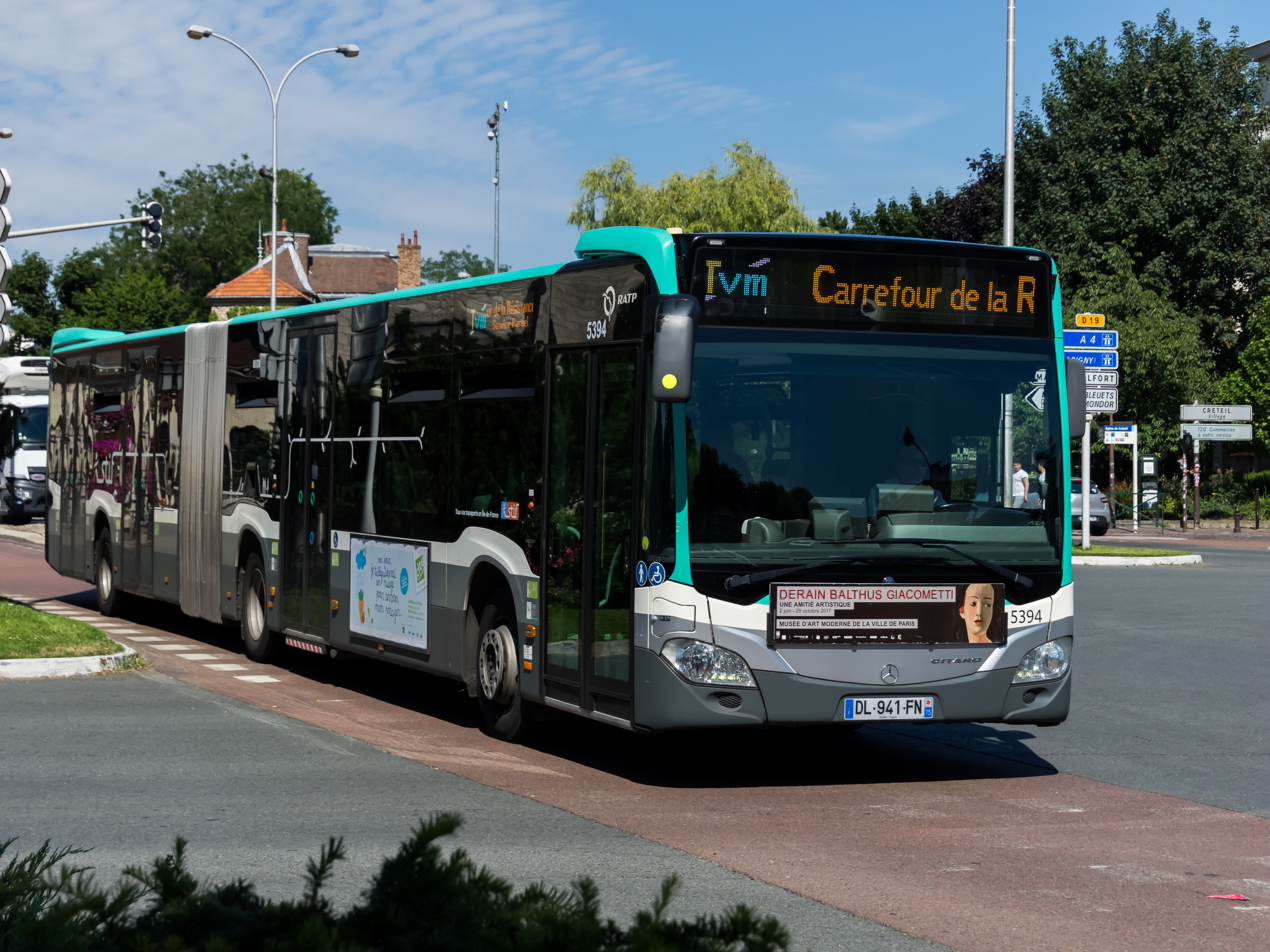
Mercedes Citaro RATP, ligne TVM, Créteil Paris

The below list only includes BRT systems in Europe that are in operation or under construction.

== Legend ==
Status (background color)

- White: Operational
- Light blue: Under construction

City
Primary city served by the buses and trolleybus.
System name
The English name of the bus rapid transit or overview article for city.
Operator
Operating the main bus services along its designated route.
Began
The year that the bus rapid transit began operating for passenger service.
Stations
Stations connected by transfers are counted as one station, unless otherwise note.
Length (km)
Track length; lines which share track are counted once or Corridor length; lines which sharing the same corridor are counted once.
Notes/Description
A short objective description and subjective of routes bus rapid transit ridership and passengers (daily).
Type
eBRT - Electric Bus Rapid Transit, using Trolleybuses or eBRT using Electric buses or other source.
BRT certified
ITDP standards-and-guides and bus-rapid-transit-standard year rewards.

=== Belgium ===
BRT systems in Belgium
| City | System name | Operator | Began | Lines | Stations | Length | Notes/Description | Type | BRT certified |
|---|---|---|---|---|---|---|---|---|---|
| Liège | Charleroi BRT | Opérateur de transport de Wallonie (TEC) | 1968 | 30 | 16 | 6 km (3.7 mi) | Busway which was documented in a Transport Research Laboratory video. | | Not BRT certified in 2022. |

=== Denmark ===
BRT systems in Denmark
| City | System name | Operator | Began | Lines | Stations | Length | Notes/Description | Type | BRT certified |
|---|---|---|---|---|---|---|---|---|---|
| Aalborg | Plusbus (da) | - | 23 September 2023 | 2 | 22 | 12 km (7.5 mi) | Launch it first "Plusbus" BRT in the city. It is a 12 km route from the eastern to the westernmost part of the city; 1 km yet to be finalized. It features bus exclusive lanes, all electric buses, each 25 meters long and with room for 153 passengers, and priority at all intersections on the route. | eBRT electric buses | Not BRT certified in 2022. |

=== Finland ===
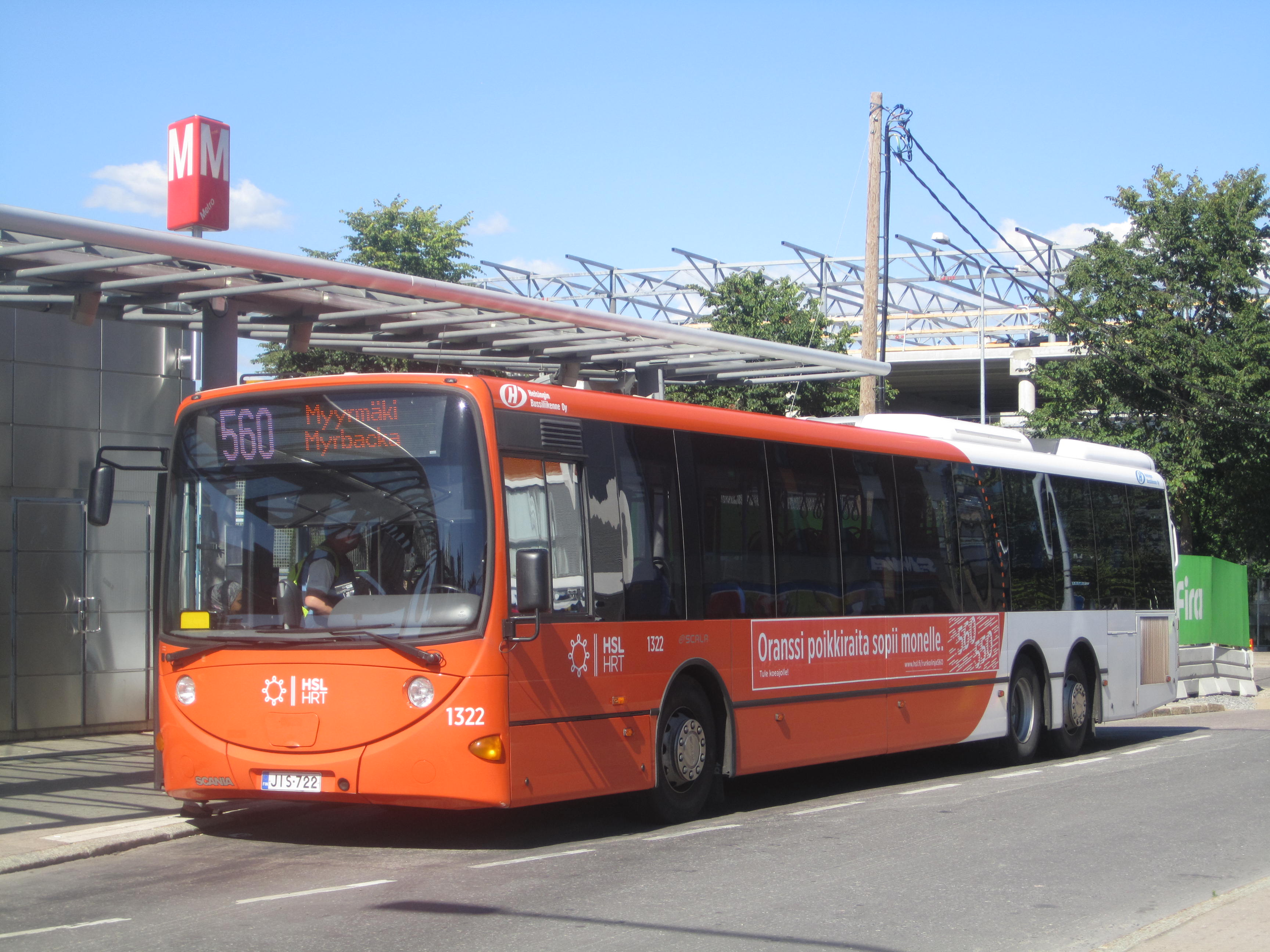
Runkolinja Rastila in Helsinki

In the following table, BRT systems in light blue are under construction.

BRT systems in Finland
| City | System name | Operator | Began | Lines | Stations | Length | Notes/Description | Type | BRT certified |
|---|---|---|---|---|---|---|---|---|---|
| Helsinki | The Jokeri line (Bussi-Jokeri Runkolinja 556) | Helsinki Regional Transport Authority | 10 August 2015 | 1 | 35 | 27.5 km (17.1 mi) | Runkolinja 550 close on 29 December 2023. | | Not BRT certified in 2022. |
| Tampere | - | - | - | - | - | - | BRT in their city (still under construction) | | Not BRT certified in 2022. |
| Turku | - | - | - | - | - | - | Have extensive bus-lane networks in their city centers. | | Not BRT certified in 2022. |

=== France ===
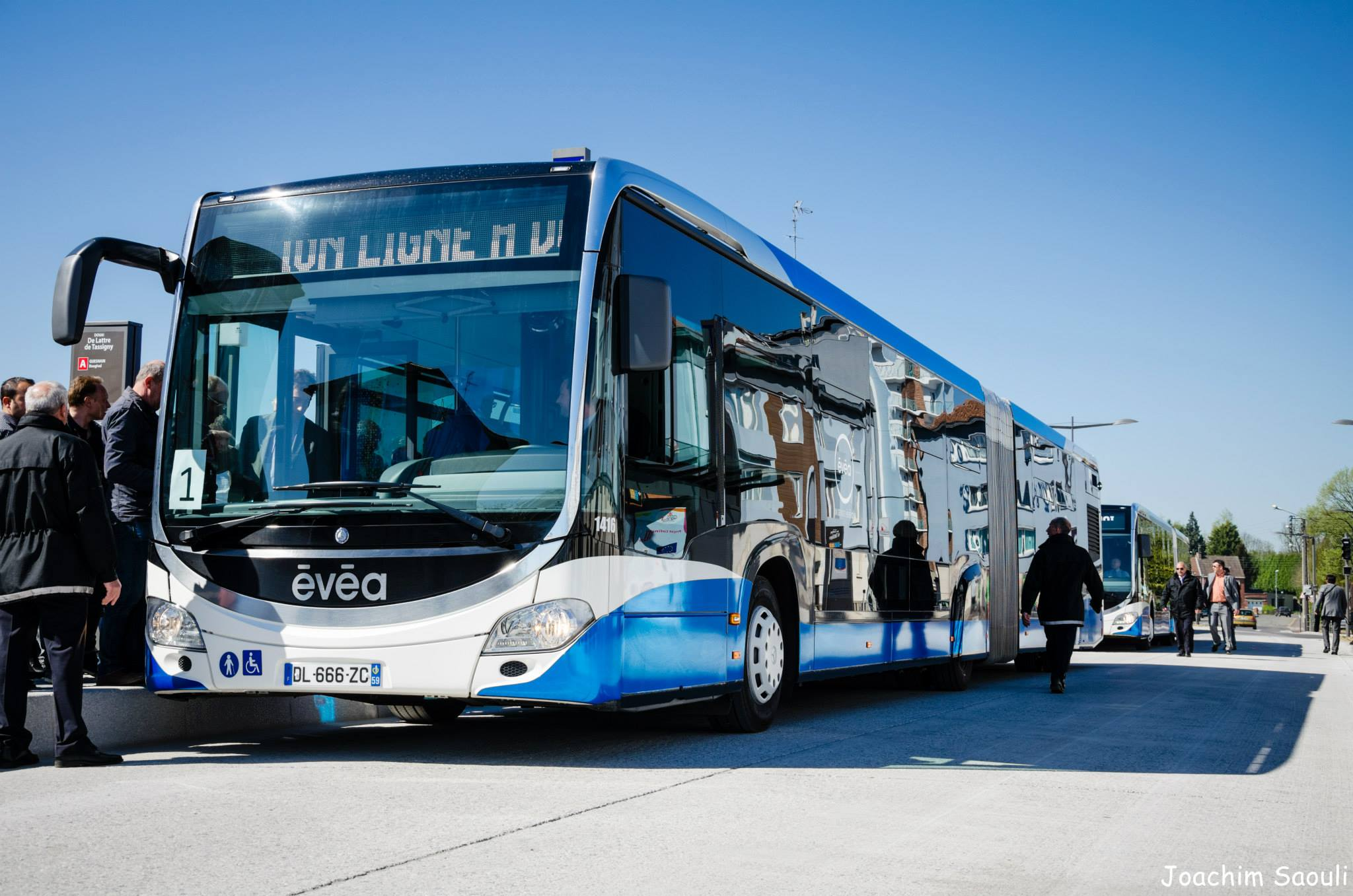
Évéa BRT in Douai

Bus à haut niveau de service (BHNS) in French - High-level bus service in English

In the following table, BRT systems in light blue are under construction.

BRT systems in France
| City | System name | French name | Began | Lines | Stations | Length | Notes/Description | Type | BRT certified |
|---|---|---|---|---|---|---|---|---|---|
| Aix-en-Provence | BHNS Aixpress | BHNS Aixpress | 2 September 2019 | 6 | 19 | 7.2 km (4.5 mi) | | eBRT electric buses | Not BRT certified in 2022. |
| Antibes | Envibus Line A | BHNS Antibes | 6 January 2020 | 76 | 35 | - | | | Not BRT certified in 2022. |
| Amiens | Ametis Nemo 1 | BHNS Amiens | 11 May 2019 | 4 | 37 | 15.7 km (9.8 mi) | | eBRT electric buses | Not BRT certified in 2022. |
| Angoulême | Réseau Möbius | BHNS Angoulême | 2 September 2019 | 49 | - | 20 km (12 mi) | | | Not BRT certified in 2022. |
| Annemasse | TAC Tango | BHNS Annemasse | 15 December 2019 | 8 | 14 | 7.5 km (4.7 mi) | | | Not BRT certified in 2022. |
| Avignon | Chrono'hop | BHNS Chrono'hop | 19 October 2019 | 2 | 56 | 25 km (16 mi) | | | Not BRT certified in 2022. |
| Bayonne | Tram Bus Line T1 | BHNS Bayonne | 2 September 2019 | 3 | 33 | - | | eBRT electric buses | Not BRT certified in 2022. |
| Belfort | BHNS Optymo | BHNS Optymo phase II | 26 August 2013 | 5 | 15 | 7.6 km (4.7 mi) | | | Not BRT certified in 2022. |
| Besançon | Besançon BRT | BHNS Besançon | 2 September 2017 | 1 | - | 4.1 km (2.5 mi) | Route of line 3 | | Not BRT certified in 2022. |
| Bordeaux | Bordeaux express bus | BHNS Bordeaux | 1 June 2024 | 2 | 90 | 42 km (26 mi) | Under construction | | |
| Brest | Brest BRT | Brest BHNS | 14 February 2026 | 1 | 13 | 4.3 km (2.7 mi) | | | |
| Cannes | Le Palm Bus Express BRT | BHNS Cannes | 2013 | 2 | 25 | 11 km (6.8 mi) | | | Not BRT certified in 2022. |
| Chalon-sur-Saône | BRT Flash | BHNS Chalon-sur-Saône | 2012 | 1 | 15 | 6 km (3.7 mi) | | | Not BRT certified in 2022. |
| Chartres | C'Pégase BRT | BHNS C'Pégas | 1 September 2025 | 2 | 35 | 14.5 km (9.0 mi) | | | |
| Clermont-Ferrand | Line B of the Clermont-Ferrand T2C network | Clermont-Ferrand BHNS | 8 December 2012 | - | - | 5.8 km (3.6 mi) | Line B of the Clermont-Ferrand BHNS, Lines B (Royat to Stade Marcel Michelin) | | Not BRT certified in 2022. |
| Clermont-Ferrand | Line C of the Clermont-Ferrand BHNS | Clermont-Ferrand BHNS | 13 January 2014 | - | - | 17.5 km (10.9 mi) | Line C of the Clermont-Ferrand BHNS, Lines C (Tamaris to Cournon-d'Auvergne) | | Not BRT certified in 2022. |
| Dijon | Divia Mobilitès | BHNS Dijon | 25 October 2004 | 36 | 1090 | - | | | Not BRT certified in 2022. |
| Douai | Évéole | BHNS Douai | 8 February 2010 | 1 | 37 | 34 km (21 mi) | Évéole is the public transport network used guided busway APTS Phileas | | Not BRT certified in 2022. |
| Douai | Douai High-Level Service Bus (Évéa) | BHNS Douai | 8 February 2010 | 1 | 37 | 18.7 km (11.6 mi) | | | Not BRT certified in 2022. |
| Évry | TICE | BHNS TICE | 31 December 2023 | 25 | 31 | 18 km (11 mi) | TICE has a segregated, elevated system. France's first line (1975). | | Not BRT certified in 2022. |
| La Rochelle | ILLICO BRT Line (Yélo Network) | BHNS La Rochelle | 2009 | 1 | 2 | 6 km (3.7 mi) | | | Not BRT certified in 2022. |
| Le Mans | Line T3 of the BHNS of Le Mans(SETRAM) | BHNS Le Mans | 20 February 2016 | 1 | 12 | 7.2 km (4.5 mi) | Line T3 of the BHNS of Le Mans | | Not BRT certified in 2022. |
| Lille | Lille Metropole Lianas | BHNS Lille | 28 January 2008 | 13 | 121 | 67 km (42 mi) | | | Not BRT certified in 2022. |
| Lens and Béthune | Tadao | BHNS Lens | 2003 | 67 | - | - | Bubble Lines | | Not BRT certified in 2022. |
| Lorient | BRT Triskell BHLS | BHNS Lorient | 2007 | 6 | 43 | 14 km (8.7 mi) | | | Not BRT certified in 2022. |
| Lyon | Lyon trolleybus line C1 | BHNS Lyon | 12 October 2006 | 2 | 7 | 8.4 km (5.2 mi) | Trolleybuses in Lyon (Line C1 and C2 and C3) | eBRT trolleybuses | Not BRT certified in 2022. |
| Lyon | Lyon trolleybus line C2 | BHNS Lyon | 29 August 2011 | 4 | 10 | 12.1 km (7.5 mi) | Trolleybuses in Lyon (Line C1 and C2 and C3) | eBRT trolleybuses | Not BRT certified in 2022. |
| Lyon | Lyon trolleybus line C3 | BHNS Lyon | 30 October 2007 | 3 | 17 | 12 km (7.5 mi) | Trolleybuses in Lyon (Line C1 and C2 and C3) | eBRT trolleybuses | Not BRT certified in 2022. |
| Marseille | Marseille RTM | BHNS de Lille | - | 5 | - | - | Très Grands Bus (TGB lines) | | Not BRT certified in 2022. |
| Maubeuge | BHLS - Viavil | - | 2008 | 1 | 14 | 8.4 km (5.2 mi) | Busway lines of the du Stibus network | | Not BRT certified in 2022. |
| Metz | BRT Mettis | BHNS Mettis | 5 October 2013 | 2 | 47 | 17.8 km (11.1 mi) | A and B Line | | Not BRT certified in 2022. |
| Metz | Line A of the Mettis of Metz | BHNS Mettis | 5 October 2013 | 2 | 26 | 12.5 km (7.8 mi) | | | Not BRT certified in 2022. |
| Metz | Line B of the Mettis de Metz | BHNS Mettis | 5 October 2013 | 3 | 22 | 11 km (6.8 mi) | | | Not BRT certified in 2022. |
| Metz | Line C of the Mettis of Metz | BHNS Mettis | - | 3 | 21 | 10 km (6.2 mi) | Under Construction still 2027 | | Not BRT certified in 2022. |
| Montpellier | Bustram of Montpellier | BHNS Montpellier | 23 May 2025 | 5 | 105 | 57 km (35 mi) | | | Not BRT certified in 2025. |
| Mulhouse | BRT Mulhouse | BHNS Mulhouse | 2 September 2013 | 1 | 16 | 8.7 km (5.4 mi) | | | Not BRT certified in 2022. |
| Nancy | Trolleybuses in Nancy | BHNS Nancy | 5 April 2025 | 1 | 25 | 10 km (6.2 mi) | Trolleybuses Line T1: Essey-lès-Nancy, Mouzimpré to Vandœuvre, Brabois-Hôpitaux | eBRT trolleybuses | Not BRT certified in 2025. |
| Nancy | BRT Tempo Lines | BHNS Nancy | 24 August 2013 | 3 | 128 | 45.6 km (28.3 mi) | Tempo Line T2: Laneuveville-devant-Nancy Centre to Laxou Sapinière, Line T3: Seichamps Haie Cerlin to Villers Campus Sciences, Line T4: Houdemont Porte Sud to reach Laxou Champ-le-Bœuf. | | Not BRT certified in 2022. |
| Nantes | Nantes Busway | BHNS Nantes | 6 November 2006 | 2 | 30 | 13 km (8.1 mi) | | eBRT electric buses | Bronze BRT certified (2013). |
| Nîmes | BRT Tango+ | BHNS Tango+ | 29 September 2012 | 1 | 9 | 7.2 km (4.5 mi) | Line T1 and line T2 | | Bronze BRT certified (2013). |
| Nîmes | Nîmes Bus Rapid Transit Line T2 | BHNS Tango+ | 7 January 2020 | 1 | 17 | 6.7 km (4.2 mi) | Line T1 and line T2 | | Bronze BRT certified (2013). |
| Paris, Île-de-France | Trans-Val-de-Marne (TVM) | - | 1 October 1993 | 2 | 32 | 19 km (12 mi) | Operated by RATP. It was the second BRT system implemented in France during the 1980s; for political reasons, there are no bus lanes through Saint-Maur-des-Fossés. | | BRT certified with Silver Excellence (2014). |
| Paris, Île-de-France | RATP bus line 393 | - | 10 September 2011 | 1 | 10 | 11 km (6.8 mi) | Créteil 393 is also operated by RATP. Shares bus lane and stations with TVM for five kilometres. | | Not BRT certified in 2022. |
| Paris, Île-de-France | T Zen | BHNS T Zen | 4 July 2011 | 1 | 14 | 14.7 km (9.1 mi) | Tzen 1 | | Not BRT certified in 2022. |
| Pau | BRT FÉBUS | BHNS FÉBUS | 8 July 2019 | 1 | 14 | 6 km (3.7 mi) | | | Not BRT certified in 2022. |
| Rennes | BRT Rennes Trambus | BHNS Rennes | - | 4 | 100 | 55 km (34 mi) | Under construction | | Not BRT certified in 2022. |
| Rouen | TEOR | - | 12 February 2001 | 4 | 65 | 39 km (24 mi) | T1, T2, T3 lines | | Silver BRT certified (2013). |
| Saint-Nazaire | BRT Helyce | BHNS Hélyce | 3 September 2012 | 2 | 20 | 9 km (5.6 mi) | | | Not BRT certified in 2022. |
| Sophia Antipolis | BRT TEO | BHNS Saint-Brieuc | - | - | - | 8 km (5.0 mi) | Bus-Tram | | Not BRT certified in 2022. |
| Strasbourg | Line G of the Strasbourg BHNS | Strasbourg BHNS | 30 November 2013 | 2 | 34 | 13.2 km (8.2 mi) | Line G of the Strasbourg BHNS (Gare Centrale–Espace Européen de l'Entreprise) | | Not BRT certified in 2022. |
| Strasbourg | Line H of the Strasbourg BHNS | Strasbourg BHNS | 24 February 2020 | 2 | 10 | 3.2 km (2.0 mi) | Line G of the Strasbourg BHNS (Gare Centrale–Espace Européen de l'Entreprise) | | Not BRT certified in 2022. |
| Toulouse | Linéo | BHNS Toulouse | 2008 | 2 | 17 | 11 km (6.8 mi) | | | Not BRT certified in 2022. |
| Tours | Line 2 Tempo | BHNS Tours | 31 August 2013 | 2 | 35 | 15.9 km (9.9 mi) | Line 2 Tempo | | Not BRT certified in 2022. |

=== Germany ===
BRT systems in Germany
| City | System name | Operator | Began | Lines | Stations | Length | Notes/Description | Type | BRT certified |
|---|---|---|---|---|---|---|---|---|---|
| Essen | Spurbus | Essen Transport AG | 1980 | 2 | - | 24.2 km (15.0 mi) | Guided buses use a busway in the center of a motorway. | | Not BRT certified in 2014. |
| Oberhausen | Oberhausen route 112 | Stadtwerke Oberhausen | 2 June 1996 | 1 | 6 | 6.8 km (4.2 mi) | | | Not BRT certified in 2014. |

=== Greece ===
In the following table, BRT systems in light blue are under construction.

BRT systems in Greece
| City | System name | Operator | Began | Lines | Stations | Length | Notes/Description | Type | BRT certified |
|---|---|---|---|---|---|---|---|---|---|
| Athens | - | - | - | - | - | - | Thermal Bus Company | | Not BRT certified in 2024. |
| Thessaloniki | - | OASTH | 6 August 1957 | 85 | 4 | - | | | Not BRT certified in 2014. |

=== Iceland ===
In the following table, BRT systems in light blue are under construction.

BRT systems in Iceland
| City | System name | Operator | Began | Lines | Stations | Length | Notes/Description | Type | BRT certified |
|---|---|---|---|---|---|---|---|---|---|
| Reykjavík | Borgarlína | - | - | - | - | - | Under construction until 2026 | | |

=== Italy ===
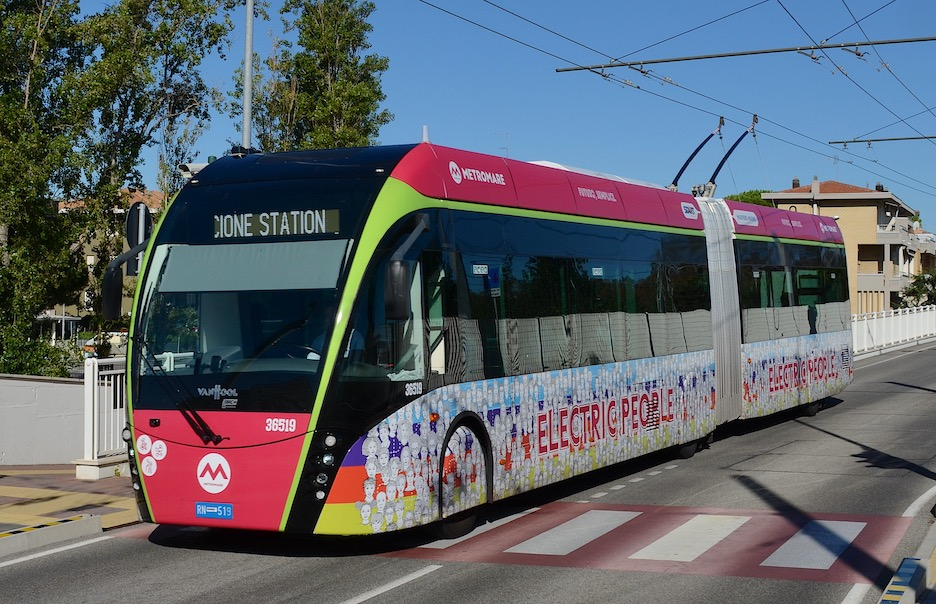
Van Hool ExquiCity 18 trolleybus in Rimini, Metromare

In the following table, BRT systems in light blue are under construction:

BRT systems in Italy
| City | System name | Operator | Began | Lines | Stations | Length | Notes/Description | Type | BRT certified |
|---|---|---|---|---|---|---|---|---|---|
| Catania | BRT | AMTS | 10 April 2013 | 2 | | 28.7 km (17.8 mi) | First BRT in Italy, in the late 2020's is gradually transitioning to electric buses. Mostly running on bus lanes. | BRT bus | Not BRT certified in 2026. |
| Rimini and Riccione | Metromare | Start Romagna SpA | 23 November 2019 | 1 | 17 | 9.8 km (6.1 mi) | Connects two of the major tourist hotspots in the Riviera Romagnola. Runs fully on a dedicated busway with 60% of the route on a single bidirectional lane. | eBRT trolleybuses | Not BRT certified in 2022. |
| Pescara | La Verde | Società Unica Abruzzese di Trasporto (TUA) | 11 September 2025 | 1 | 26 | 8.15 km (5.06 mi) | Main public transport corridor of Pescara metropolitan area. 75% running on a dedicated busway. | eBRT trolleybuses | Not BRT certified in 2025. |
| Bergamo | e-BRT | ATB | 4 August 2026 | 1 | 42 | 14.85 km (9.23 mi) | Regional industrial corridor connecting Bergamo with many business parks and local university. Mostly running on bus lanes. | eBRT electric buses | Not BRT certified in 2026. |
| Taranto | BRT | - | - | - | - | - | System under construction (2 lines) | eBRT electric buses | Not BRT certified in 2022. |
| Turin | - | Gruppo Torinese Trasporti | - | - | - | - | System under construction (1 line) | eBRT electric buses | Not BRT certified in 2025. |
| Genoa | 4 Assi di Forza | - | - | - | - | - | System under construction (4 lines) | eBRT trolleybuses | Not BRT certified in 2022. |
| Bari | BariGO | AMTAB | - | - | - | - | System under construction (4 lines) | eBRT electric buses | Not BRT certified in 2026. |
| Perugia | Metrobus | | - | - | - | - | System under construction (1 line) | eBRT electric buses | Not BRT certified in 2026. |

=== Netherlands ===
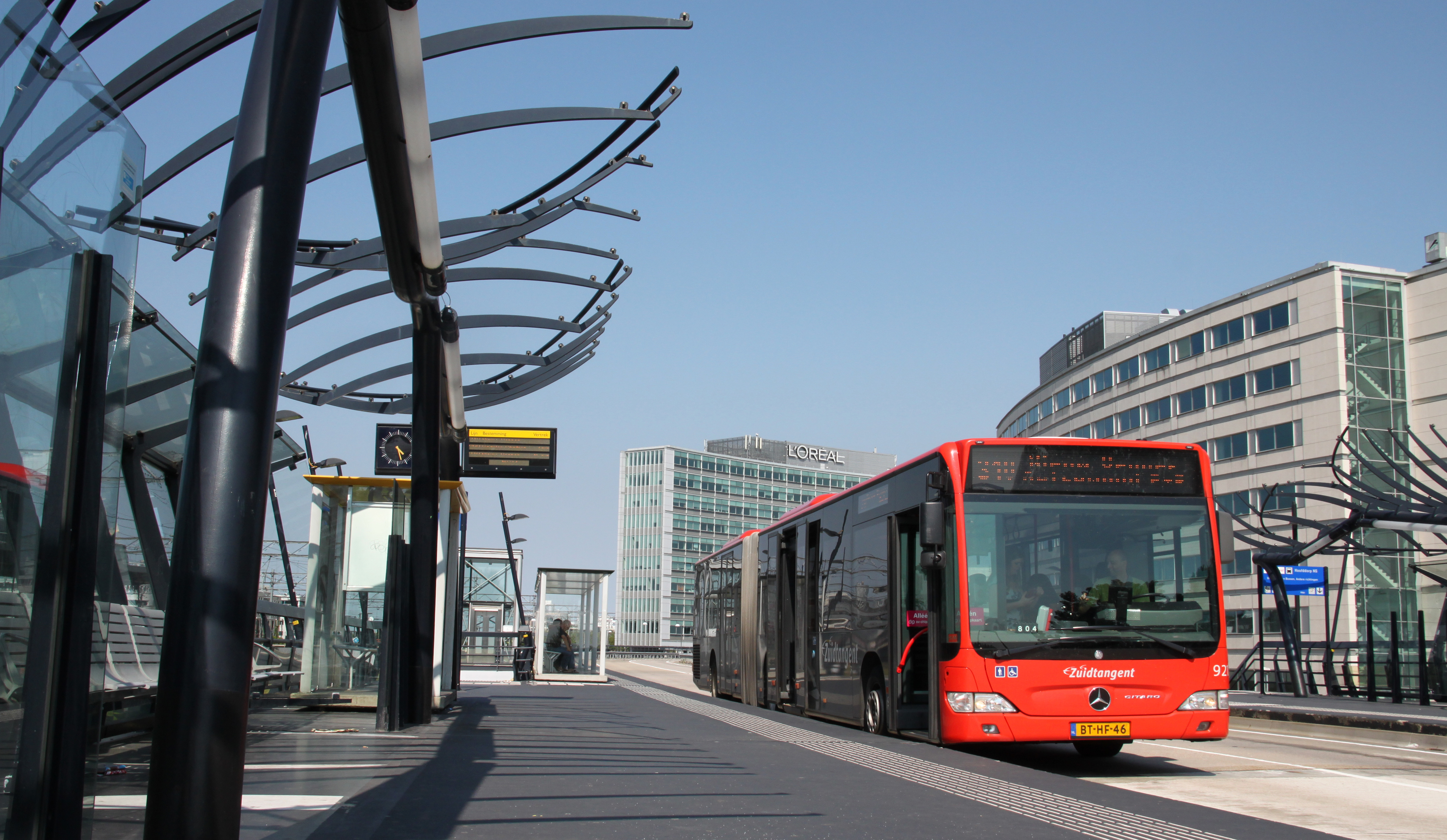
Zuidtangent bus in Hoofddorp

BRT systems in Netherlands
| City | System name | Operator | Began | Lines | Stations | Length | Notes/Description | Type | BRT certified |
|---|---|---|---|---|---|---|---|---|---|
| Almere | AllGo (Maxx Almere) | Connexxion | 10 December 2017 | 10 | 19 | 58 km (36 mi) | Started on 4 January 2004 and Close Maxx Almere on 9 December 2017 replace to AllGo Buses. | | Not BRT certified in 2022. |
| Eindhoven | Phileas | - | 2003 | 3 | 32 | 15 km (9.3 mi) | Bus rapid transit and guided busway, Phileas system in Eindhoven. | | Not BRT certified in 2014. |
| Amsterdam, Schiphol | R-net(Zuidtangent) | GVB | 2002 | 2 | 33 | 56.7 km (35.2 mi) | Zuidtangent rename to R-net Buses lines 300 and 397. | | Not BRT certified in 2014. |
| Enschede | Bravodirect (HOV) | Twents (public transport) | July 2018 | 2 | 40 | 23 km (14 mi) | High-quality public transport (HOV Buses) under Bravodirect. | | Not BRT certified in 2022. |
| Utrecht | U-OV | Qbuzz | 2001 | 2 | 16 | 8.2 km (5.1 mi) | Line 28 to the De Uithof university campus and Vleuten. | | Not BRT certified in 2014. |

=== Norway ===
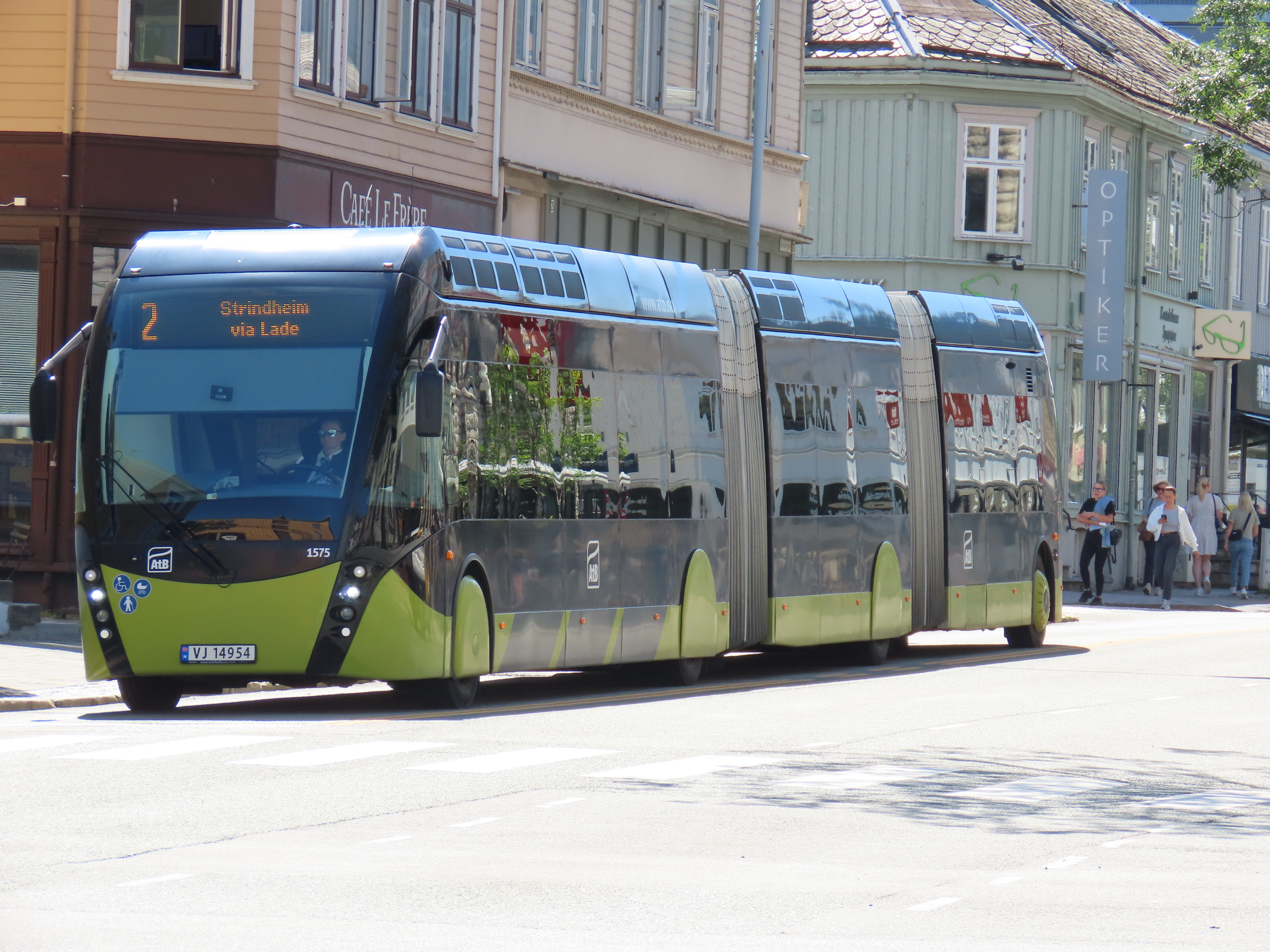
Trondheim AtB metrobus

In the following table, BRT systems in light blue are under construction.

BRT systems in Norway
| City | System name | Operator | Began | Lines | Stations | Length | Notes/Description | Type | BRT certified |
|---|---|---|---|---|---|---|---|---|---|
| Trondheim | Metrobus | Vy Buss, Tide ASA | 3 August 2019 | 3 | 150 | - | The city's transport authority, claim AtB as owner of company | | Not BRT certified in 2022. |
| Stavanger/Sandnes | Bussveien | - | - | - | - | 50 km (31 mi) | The bus rapid transit system planned to be the longest in Europe, 50 km, 80% dedicated right of way. (Under construction planned finished phase one: 2026.) | | Not BRT certified in 2025. |

=== Poland ===
In the following table, BRT systems in light blue are under construction.

BRT systems in Poland
| City | System name | Operator | Began | Lines | Stations | Length | Notes/Description | Type | BRT certified |
|---|---|---|---|---|---|---|---|---|---|
| Kraków | - | - | - | - | - | - | There is a bus rapid transit system shared with trams, consisting of two sections, one at Monte Cassino Street and another one at Grzegórzki Street, Warsaw Uprisers' Avenue and in the north part of Old Town ring, as well as bus lanes on the Three Wisemen Avenues. | | Not BRT certified in 2024. |

=== Portugal ===
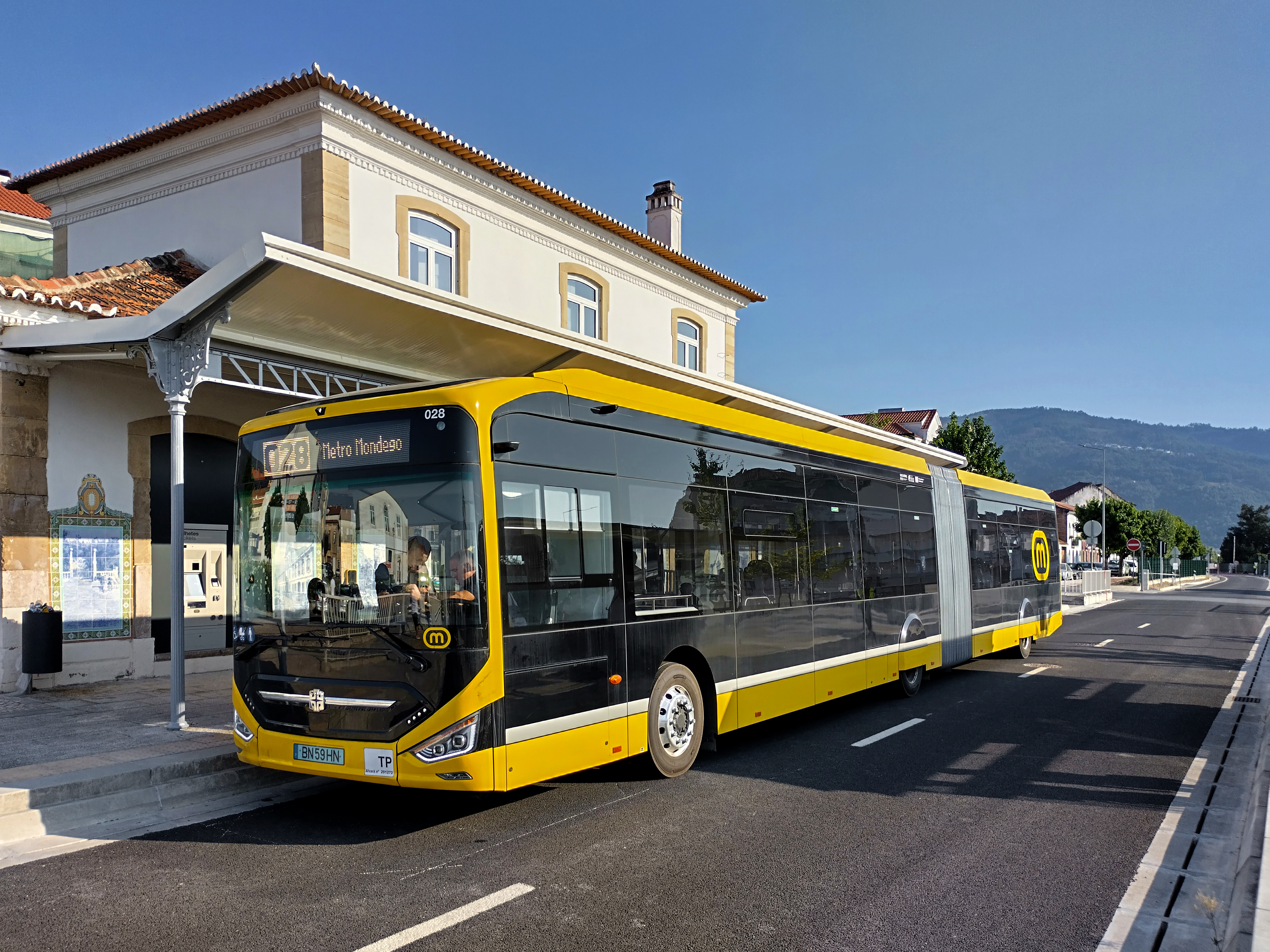
Metrocarro Estacao Lousa, Metro Mondego Mobility System

In the following table, BRT systems in light blue are under construction.

BRT systems in Portugal
| City | System name | Operator | Began | Lines | Stations | Length | Notes/Description | Type | BRT certified |
|---|---|---|---|---|---|---|---|---|---|
| Coimbra | Mondego Mobility System | Metro Mondego, SA | 29 August 2025 | 3 | 42 | 42 km (26 mi) | Portugal's first Bus Rapid Transit system was announced in 2020 and is expected to launch by the end of 2025. With an extension of 42 km, 42 stations, 35 vehicles, and initially connecting 3 municipalities. To be completed by 2025, with the first phase operational by the end of 2024. Construction is currently under way. | eBRT electric buses | Not BRT certified in 2024. |
| Porto | Metrobus line 1: (Casa da Música – Império) | Metro do Porto | 28 February 2026 | 1 | 7 | 3.7 km (2.3 mi) | A Bus Rapid Transit System, produced by Caetanobus will be built between Boa Vista and Praça do Império. It will be 8 kilometres long and is scheduled to be completed by the last quarter of 2023. It plans to have a fleet of 8 hydrogen fuel cell bus powered articulated buses. | | Not BRT certified in 2024. |
| Porto | Metrobus line 2: (Casa da Música – Anémona) | Metro do Porto | August 2026 | 1 | 9 | 6 km (3.7 mi) | A Bus Rapid Transit System, produced by Caetanobus will be built between Boa Vista and Praça do Império. It will be 8 kilometres long and is scheduled to be completed by the last quarter of 2023. It plans to have a fleet of 8 hydrogen fuel cell bus powered articulated buses. | | Not BRT certified in 2024. |
| Braga | Braga BRT | - | - | - | - | - | Under construction, to be completed by 2026. | | Not BRT certified in 2024. |
| Faro | Algarve Metrobus | - | - | 1 | 24 | 34 km (21.1 mi) | A proposed 38 kilometre line that will that will connect the city of Faro with the neighboring municipalities of Olhão and Loulé. It will serve around 85,000 residents, costing €300-€510 million upon completion in 2029. (Under construction, to be completed by 2029) | | Not BRT certified in 2024. |

=== Spain ===
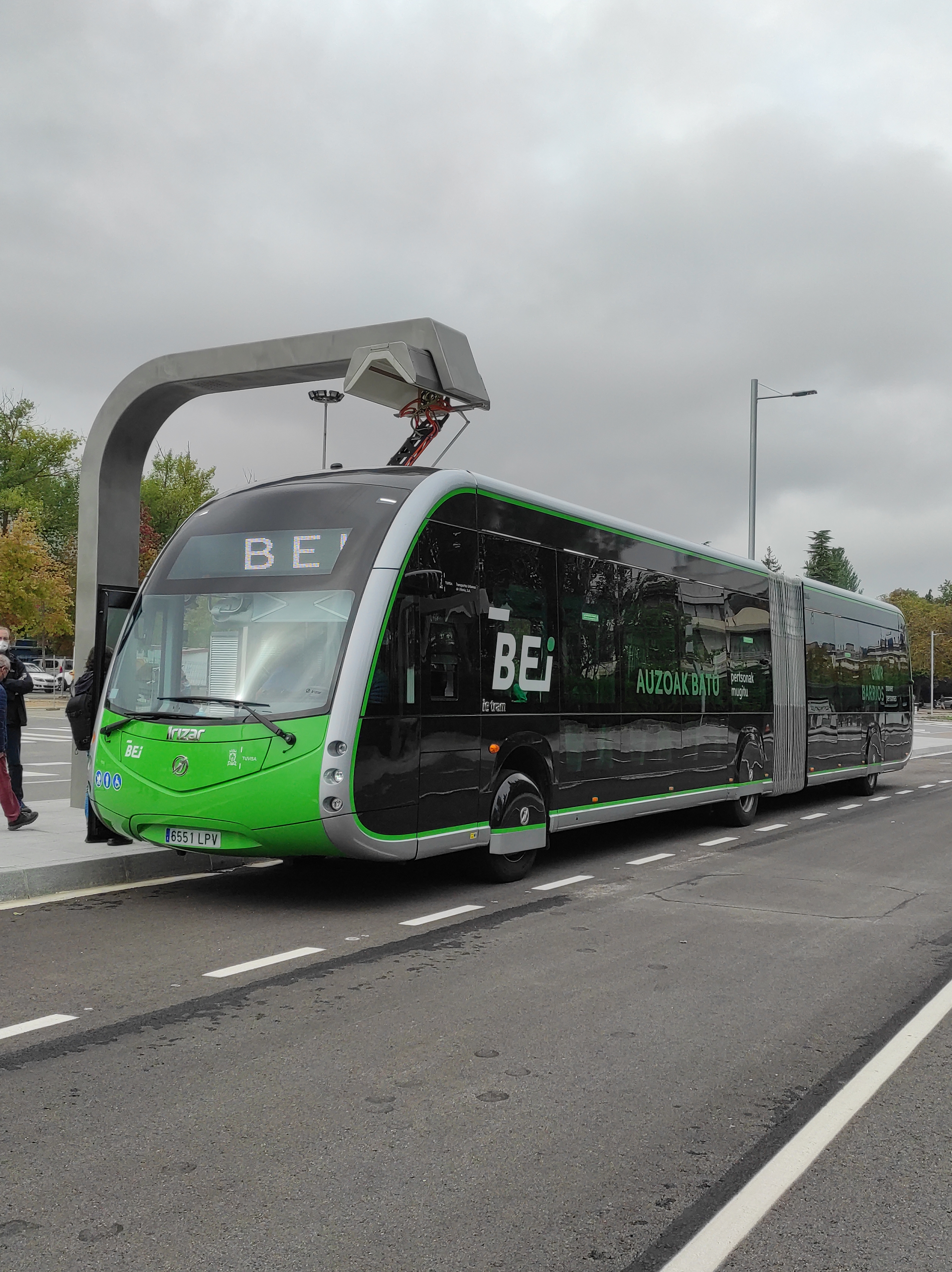
Unidad articulada del BEi TUVISA in Vitoria-Gasteiz

In the following table, BRT systems in light blue are under construction.

BRT systems in Spain
| City | System name | Operator | Began | Lines | Stations | Length | Notes/Description | Type | BRT certified |
|---|---|---|---|---|---|---|---|---|---|
| Barcelona | Barcelona Orthogonal Bus Network | Transports Metropolitans de Barcelona (TMB) | 1 October 2012 | 28 | - | - | | eBRT electric buses | Not BRT certified in 2022. |
| Castellón de la Plana | TRAM Castellón | Mediterranean Cars (AMSA) | 25 June 2008 | 1 | 19 | 7.765 km (4.825 mi) | | eBRT trolleybuses | Not BRT certified in 2022. |
| Granada | Granada LAC | Rober Transport | 29 June 2014 | 1 | 19 | 8.4 km (5.2 mi) | | | Not BRT certified in 2022. |
| Las Palmas | MetroGuagua | Municipal Buses | - | 12 | 20 | 11.7 km (7.3 mi) | System under construction expected for 2027. | eBRT electric buses | Not BRT certified in 2024. |
| Madrid | Line BR1 (EMT Madrid) | EMT Madrid | May 2023 | 8 | - | 31 km (19 mi) | | eBRT electric buses | Not BRT certified in 2022. |
| Murcia | Tranvibus de Murcie | - | - | 3 | - | 20.84 km (12.95 mi) | | eBRT electric buses | Not BRT certified in 2024. |
| Seville | Tranvibus de Séville | TUSSAM | 2025 | 2 | 17 | 12.1 km (7.5 mi) | | | Not BRT certified in 2024. |
| Pamplona | Regional Urban Transport Trunk Network | Transports Ciutat Comtal (TCC) | - | 4 | - | 24 km (15 mi) | | | Not BRT certified in 2024. |
| Vitoria-Gasteiz | BEI of Vitoria (Bus Electrocínico Inteligente) | TUVISA (Vitoria Urban Transport SA) | 1 March 2022 | 2 | 23 | 10,157 km (6,311 mi) | | eBRT electric buses | Not BRT certified in 2022. |

=== Sweden ===
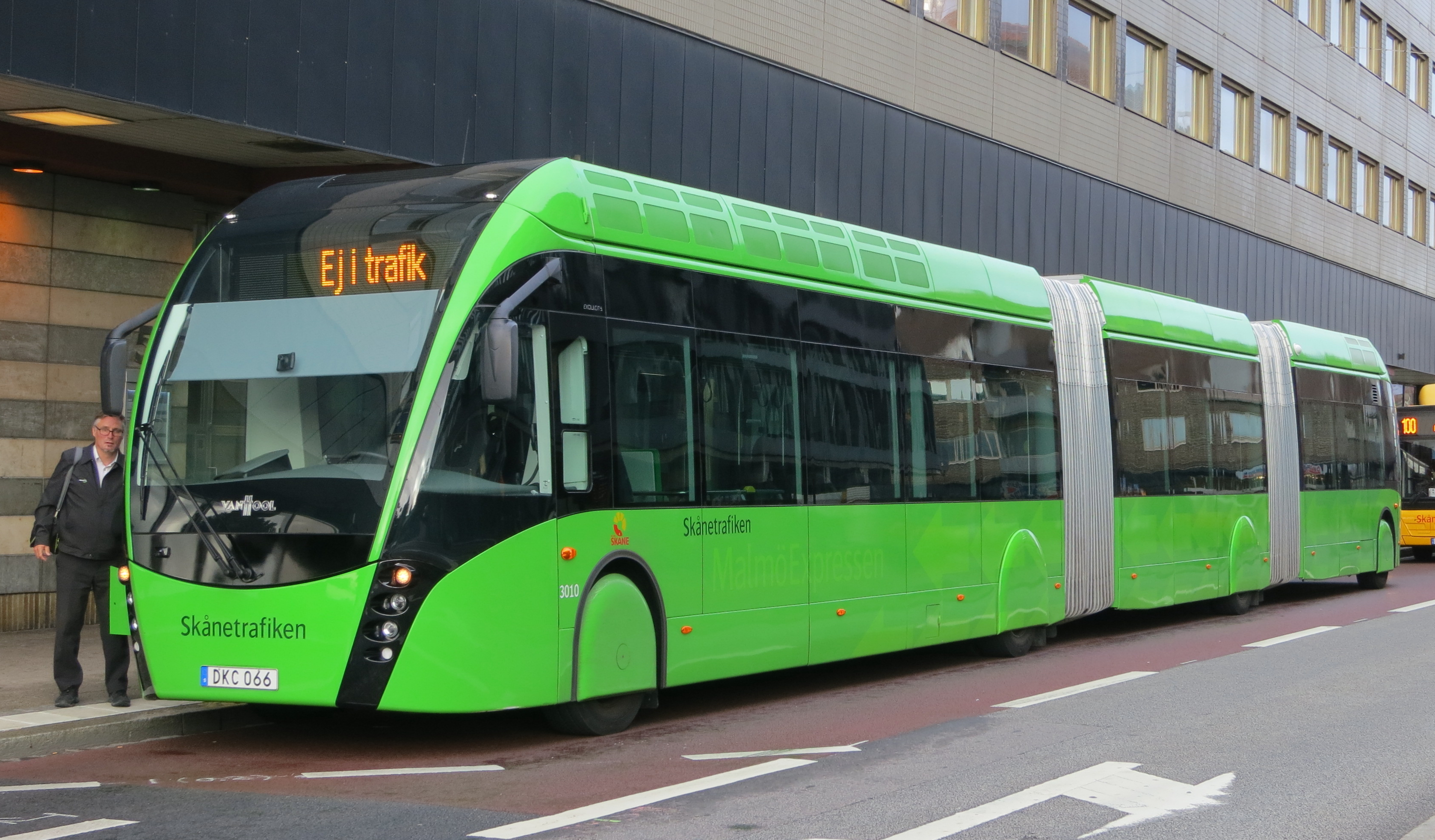
A modern bi-articulated bus Malmö Expressen Line 5 in Malmö, Sweden

BRT systems in Sweden
| City | System name | Operator | Began | Lines | Stations | Length | Notes/Description | Type | BRT certified |
|---|---|---|---|---|---|---|---|---|---|
| Gothenburg | Stombussar | Västtrafik | January 2003 | 4 | 24 | 17 km (11 mi) | The lines (16-19) have frequent service. Routes usually share the right-of-way with trams or have a busway. | | Not BRT certified in 2022. |
| Stockholm | Blåbussar (Blue buses) | Storstockholms Lokaltrafik | 1998 | 5 | - | 40 km (25 mi) | The lines (1-4, 6) run frequently and have a higher priority than other buses. The buses are blue; other buses are red. Differences between blue and red buses are very slight however. | | Not BRT certified in 2022. |
| Malmö | Malmö Expressen Line 5 (Huvudlinjer) | Nobina Sverige and Skånetrafiken | 1 June 2014 | 8 | 16 | - | The (main lines) (1-8), which run every seven or eight minutes on weekdays. | eBRT electric buses | Not BRT certified in 2022. |
| Jönköping | Citybussarna | Örebro County Transport | 1996 | 3 | 440 | 39.2 km (24.4 mi) | Line (1-3), which usually run about every 10 minutes. | | Not BRT certified in 2022. |
| Örebro | Stombussar | City buses in Västerås and Länstrafiken Örebro | 1915 | 10 | - | - | It serve two other urban lines. | | Not BRT certified in 2022. |
| Linköping | Stomlinjer | Östgötatrafiken | - | 6 | - | - | | | Not BRT certified in 2022. |

=== Switzerland ===
BRT systems in Switzerland
| City | System name | Operator | Began | Lines | Stations | Length | Notes/Description | Type | BRT certified |
|---|---|---|---|---|---|---|---|---|---|
| Geneva | TOSA | Geneva Public Transport | December 2025 | 1 | - | - | Bus line 5 | eBRT electric buses | Not BRT certified in 2025. |

=== Turkey ===
- (See: Asia/Turkey section)

=== United Kingdom ===
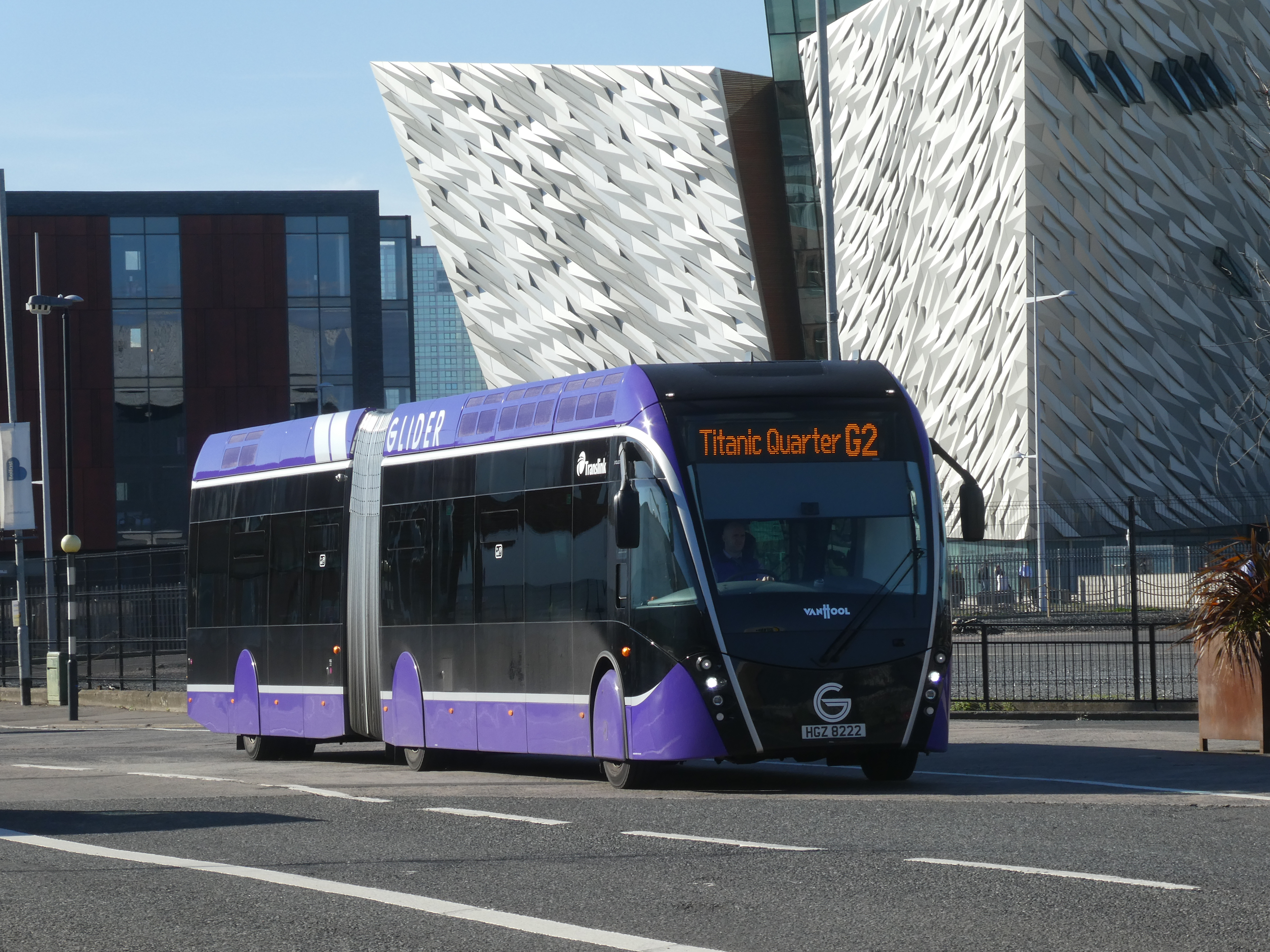
Van Hool Exqui.City 18 bus on route G2 in the Titanic Quarter, Belfast, N. Ireland

In the following table, BRT systems in light blue are under construction.

BRT systems in United Kingdom
| City | System name | Operator | Began | Lines | Stations | Length | Notes/Description | Type | BRT certified |
|---|---|---|---|---|---|---|---|---|---|
| Belfast | Glider (EWAY) | Translink | September 2018 | - | - | 24.5 km (15.2 mi) | The bus rapid transit system operating on Service G1 serves east–west and service G2 serves Titanic Quarter. | eBRT electric buses | Not BRT certified in 2022. |
| Birmingham, West Midlands | Sprint. Sprint | Diamond West Midlands | - | 7 | - | - | A limited stop service with dedicated bus lanes, with a total of 7 routes to be operational by 2026. (Under construction until 2026) | | Not BRT certified in 2022. |
| Bradford | Manchester Road Quality Bus Initiative Bradford end | First West Yorkshire | October 2001 | - | - | - | 1.4 miles (2.3 km) of guided busway and a further 0.6 miles (1 km) of unguided bus lanes on Manchester Road to the city centre. | | Not BRT certified in 2022. |
| Bristol | MetroBus | First West of England | 29 May 2018 | 5 | - | 50 km (31 mi) | The bus rapid transit network which is a section of guided busway in Ashton Gate and a bus-only exit and bridge on the M32 motorway | | Not BRT certified in 2022. |
| Cambridgeshire | Cambridgeshire Guided Busway | Stagecoach East & Whippet | 7 August 2011 | 3 | 8 | 25 km (16 mi) | The guided busway runs north-west from Milton Road to St Ives and south from the station to the Trumpington park and ride. | | Bronze BRT certified (2013). |
| Colchester | Colchester BRT | First Essex | 2025 | 1 | 8 | 8 km (5.0 mi) | | | Not BRT certified in 2025. |
| Crawley | Fastway BRT | Metrobus | October 2006 | 3 | 150 | 24 km (15 mi) | Segregated lanes and 1 mile (1.5 km) of guided busway. route 10 connects Bewbush to Gatwick Airport, Route 20 links Broadfield to Horley, and Route 100 runs between Maidenbower and Redhill, all with stops in Crawley and Gatwick Airport | | Not BRT certified in 2022. |
| Hampshire | South East Hampshire BRT (Eclipse) | First Hampshire & Dorset | 22 April 2012 | 2 | 7 | 3.4 km (2.1 mi) | Between Gosport and Fareham. A 2.8-mile (4.5 km) bus-only road along the former Fareham–Gosport line has been opened from Titchborne Way in Gosport to Redlands Lane in Fareham as phase one of a larger scheme. Operated by First Hampshire & Dorset as Eclipse. | | Not BRT certified in 2022. |
| Hertfordshire & Essex | Hertfordshire Essex Rapid Transit (HERT) | - | - | 3 | | | Proposed system across Hertfordshire and part of Essex | Not yet specified | Not BRT certified in 2022. |
| Ipswich | Ipswich Rapid Transit (Superroute 66) | First Bus East of England | 1995 | - | - | - | It is a 219 yards (200 m) guided busway section. | | Not BRT certified in 2022. |
| Kent & Essex | Fastrack | Go-Ahead London & Stagecoach South East | 26 March 2006 | 7 | - | - | Unguided with sections of segregated running using standard buses and was re-opened on 17 November 2024 | eBRT electric buses | Not BRT certified in 2022. |
| Leeds | Leeds Superbus | First West Yorkshire | July 1998 | - | - | - | Guided busway along York Road (the A64) | | Not BRT certified in 2022. |
| Liverpool | - | Metro (Merseytravel; Operator TBC) | - | - | - | - | New rapid 'Glider' bus that will provide connections to Liverpool John Lennon Airport and the city's football stadiums by 2028. The 18-metre, articulated vehicle can transport around 30% more passengers than an average double decker bus. Under construction | eBRT electric buses | Not BRT certified in 2022. |
| London | East London Transit | Blue Triangle & Go-Ahead London | 20 February 2010 | - | - | | Bus rapid transit system with three routes. | | Not BRT certified in 2022. |
| Luton | Luton to Dunstable Busway | Arriva & Centrebus and Grant Palmer | 24 September 2013 | - | - | 13.4 km (8.3 mi) | It runs between Luton Airport and Houghton Regis via Dunstable following the Dunstable branch line, which closed in 1989, running parallel to the A505 (Dunstable Road) and A5065 (Hatters Way).It runs for 6.1 miles, 4.8 mi are guided bus track with a maximum speed of 50 mph. The £91 million scheme. | | Not BRT certified in 2022. |
| Greater Manchester | Leigh-Salford-Manchester Bus Rapid Transit | Go North West, Bee Network | 3 April 2016 | 2 | 35 | 22 km (14 mi) | From Leigh and Atherton to Manchester via Tyldesley and Ellenbrook. The 29-stop scheme totals 14 miles (22 km) and uses part of a former railway line to form a 4 miles (7 km) guided busway with a pedestrian and cycle lane and bridleway. It then joins the East Lancashire Road in a dedicated bus lane. | | Not BRT certified in 2022. |
| Gateshead, Newcastle upon Tyne & Tyne and Wear | Centrelink | Go North East | - | - | - | - | Was an infrastructure project including an exclusive busway for bendy bus services | | Not BRT certified in 2022. |
| Runcorn | Runcorn Busway | Arriva North West | October 1971 | - | 38 | 22 km (14 mi) | It was the first BRT system in the world and runs for 22 kilometres (14 mi) in a figure of 8 across the town. | | Not BRT certified in 2022. |
| Sheffield | Bus Rapid Transit North | First South Yorkshire | 4 September 2016 | 3 | - | - | - | | Not BRT certified in 2022. |
| Swansea | FTR Metro | First Cymru | September 2009 | 1 | 27 | 13.5 km (8.4 mi) | Partially segregated, specialised BRT vehicles, on-board payment to customer-care attendant, runs every 15 minutes from 7 am to 7 pm (a conventional bus at other times). | | Not BRT certified in 2022. |
