= List of bus rapid transit systems in Africa =

The term bus rapid transit system (BRT system) has been applied to a wide range of bus, trolleybus, and electric bus systems. In 2012, the Institute for Transportation and Development Policy (ITDP) published a BRT Standard to make it easier to standardize and compare bus services.

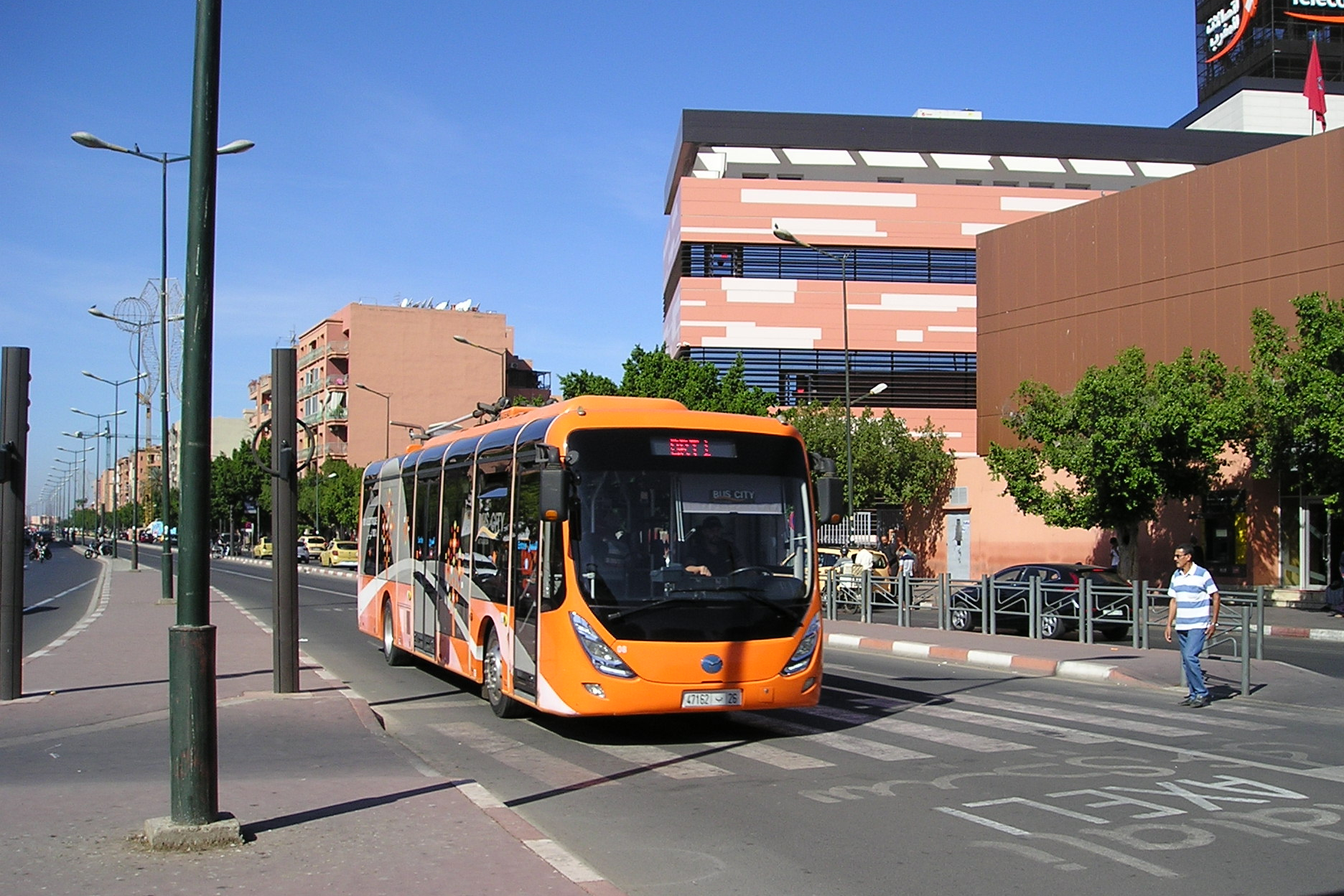
Dongfeng-ALSA bus in Marrakesh, Morocco, BRT Marrakesh

The below list only includes BRT systems in Africa that are in operation or under construction.

== Legend ==
Status (background color)

- White: Operational
- Light blue: Under construction

City
Primary city served by the buses and trolleybus.
System name
The English name of the bus rapid transit or overview article for city.
Operator
Operating the main bus services along its designated route.
Began
The year that the bus rapid transit began operating for passenger service.
Stations
Stations connected by transfers are counted as one station, unless otherwise note.
Length (km)
Track length; lines which share track are counted once or Corridor length; lines which sharing the same corridor are counted once.
Notes/Description
A short objective description and subjective of routes bus rapid transit ridership and passengers (daily).
Type
eBRT - Electric Bus Rapid Transit, using Trolleybuses or eBRT using Electric buses or other source.
BRT certified
ITDP standards-and-guides and bus-rapid-transit-standard year rewards.

=== Ethiopia ===
In the following table, BRT systems in light blue are under construction.

BRT systems in Ethiopia
City	System name	Began	Lines	Stations	Length	Notes/Description	Type	BRT certified
Addis Ababa	-	-	2	-	15.3 km (9.5 mi)	Under construction		Not BRT certified in 2024.

=== Egypt ===
BRT systems in Egypt
City	System name	Operator	Began	Lines	Stations	Length	Notes/Description	Type	BRT certified
Cairo	Cairo Bus Rapid Transit	Ministry of Transportation	3 July 2025	1	14	35 km (22 mi)	Ring Road with the Alexandria Agricultural Road to the Police Academy station. 1 June 2025 (trial operation)	eBRT electric buses	Not BRT certified in 2022.

=== Ghana ===
BRT systems in Ghana
City	System name	Began	Lines	Stations	Length	Notes/Description	Type	BRT certified
Accra	Aayalolo	25 November 2016	1	27	22 km (14 mi)	It was initially planned as a bus transit system with dedicated lanes, but because these lanes were not provided it was renamed Quality Bus System (QBS).		Not BRT certified in 2022.

=== Ivory Coast ===
In the following table, BRT systems in light blue are under construction.

BRT systems in Ivory Coast
City	System name	Operator	Began	Lines	Stations	Length	Notes/Description	Type	BRT certified
Abidjan	-	Abidjan Transport Company	-	-	-	-	Under construction		Not BRT certified in 2024.

=== Kenya ===
BRT systems in Kenya
City	System name	Operator	Began	Lines	Stations	Length	Notes/Description	Type	BRT certified
Nairobi	MRTS BRT	Namata	July 2022	1	-	20 km (12 mi)			Not BRT certified in 2024.

=== Mayotte ===
In the following table, BRT systems in light blue are under construction.

BRT systems in Mayotte
City	System name	Operator	Began	Lines	Stations	Length	Notes/Description	Type	BRT certified
Mamoudzou	CariBus T1 Line	Dembeni-Mamoudzou Agglomeration Community (Cadema)	-	3	-	-	Under construction		Not BRT certified in 2022.

=== Morocco ===
BRT systems in Morocco
City	System name	Operator	Began	Lines	Stations	Length	Notes/Description	Type	BRT certified
Marrakesh	BRT Marrakesh	City of Marrakesh	29 September 2017	1	8	8 km (5.0 mi)		eBRT trolleybuses	Not BRT certified in 2022.
Casablanca	Casablanca Busway	RATP Dev Casablanca	1 March 2024	2	42	24.5 km (15.2 mi)			Not BRT certified in 2022.
Agadir	Amalway Agadir Trambus	Agadir Mobility SA	2025	1	35	15.5 km (9.6 mi)		eBRT electric buses	Not BRT certified in 2022.

=== Mozambique ===
In the following table, BRT systems in light blue are under construction.

BRT systems in Mozambique
City	System name	Began	Lines	Stations	Length	Notes/Description	Type	BRT certified
Maputo	Maputo BRT	-	-	-	-	Under construction		Not BRT certified in 2024.

=== Nigeria ===
BRT systems in Nigeria
City	System name	Region	Began	Lines	Stations	Length	Notes/Description	Type	BRT certified
Lagos	Lagos BRT	Lagos Metropolitan Area Transport Authority (LAMATA)	17 March 2008	1	28	22 km (14 mi)	The Lagos Metropolitan Area Transport Authority LAMATA BRT corridor is about 22 kilometres long. The Nigerian government is building a BRT system for the Lagos Metropolitan Area, and the project's first phase has been completed. The first phase, from mile 12 through Ikorodu Road and Funsho Williams Avenue to CMS.		Not BRT certified in 2016.
Lagos	Oshodi - Abule-Egba BRT Lane	Abule Egba	-	-	-	13.65 km (8.48 mi)	The first phase cost N4.5 billion (about US$35 million). It included elevated segregation barriers, road repairs on bus and service lanes, de-silting of blocked drainage channels, and bus stops.		Not BRT certified in 2016.

=== Rwanda ===
In the following table, BRT systems in light blue are under construction.

BRT systems in Rwanda
City	System name	Began	Lines	Stations	Length	Notes/Description	Type	BRT certified
Kigali	-	-	-	-	-	Under construction		Not BRT certified in 2024.

=== Senegal ===
BRT systems in Senegal
City	System name	Began	Lines	Stations	Length	Notes/Description	Type	BRT certified
Dakar	Sunu BRT	14 January 2024	2	23	18.3 km (11.4 mi)	The Dakar, ongoing construction since 2019, delivery planned by the end of 2023. It will work together with the Train Express Regional Dakar-AIBD to improve the public transportation system around and in Dakar.	eBRT electric buses	Not BRT certified in 2022.

=== South Africa ===
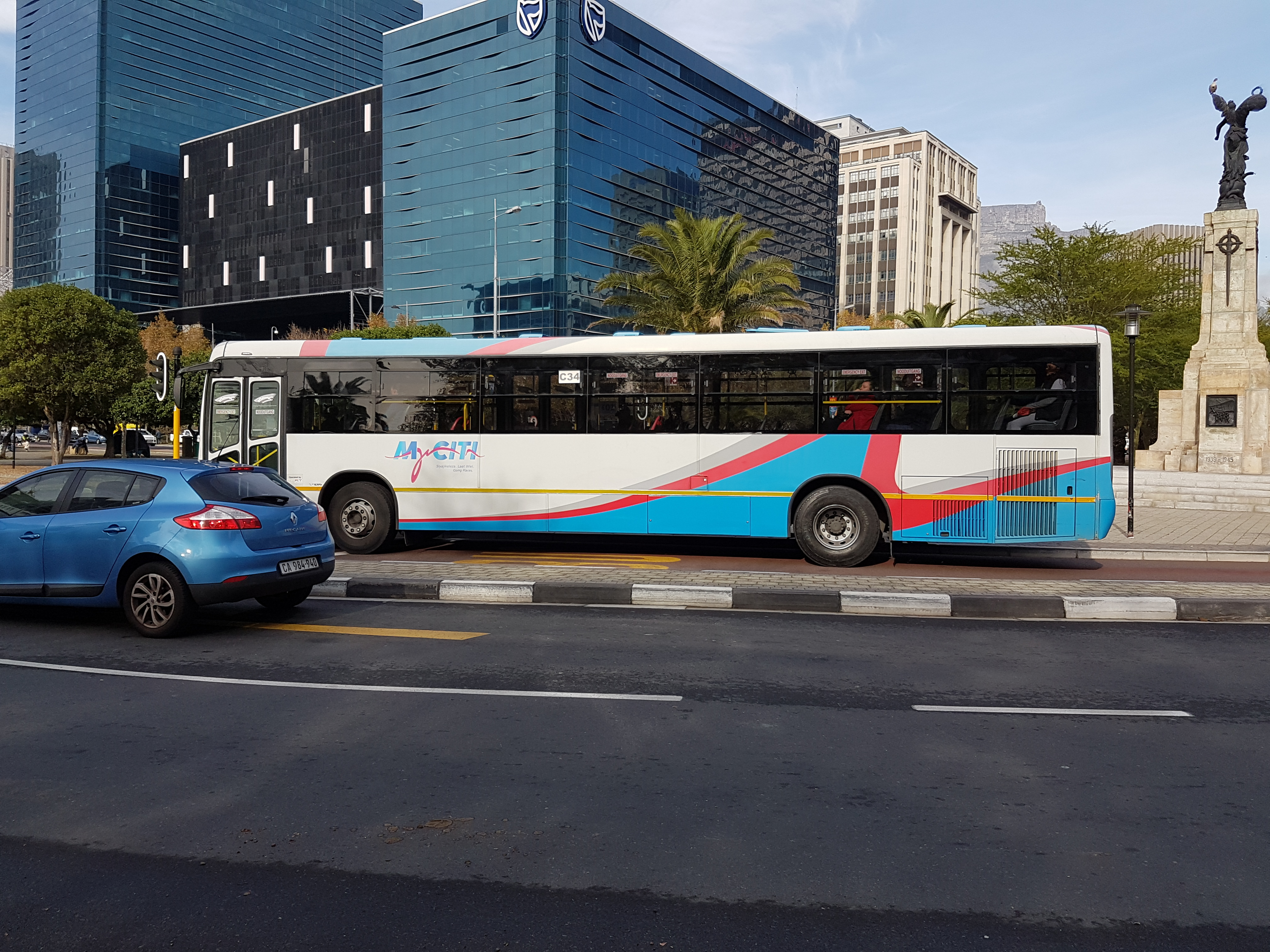
MyCiTi bus in the Foreshore, Cape Town

In the following table, BRT systems in light blue are under construction.

BRT systems in South Africa
City	System name	Region	Began	Lines	Stations	Length	Notes/Description	Type	BRT certified
Cape Town	MyCiTi	City of Cape Town	May 2010	39	42	20 km (12 mi) of dedicated bus lanes, plus a broader network of shared lanes with passenger vehicles	MyCiTi system began operations in May 2010, just before the World Cup. Its first service was a shuttle from the airport to the central business district. The initial Phase 1A trunk and feeder services began operation in May 2011. The remaining Phase 1A construction was completed in 2014, and phase 1B construction was completed in 2015. Construction of Phase 2A commenced in 2023, and is in progress. Subsequently, the network will be significantly expanded, including via links to nearby towns, via Phase 3 and Phase 4 projects.		Bronze BRT certified (2013).
George	Go George BRT	Garden Route District Municipality	August 2015	-	-	-			Not BRT certified in 2022.
Johannesburg	Rea Vaya	City of Johannesburg	30 August 2009	-	-	25.5 km (15.8 mi)	Rea Vaya ("We're moving") line opened its first phase (Phase 1A) to the public on 30 August 2009, and BRT expansion is under construction; stations and roadworks are mainly completed or are in the final stages. The system was partially opened for the 2010 World Cup, with the full system linking most of Johannesburg from Soweto in the south to beyond Sandton in the north. Buses include those able to use the BRT stations and general bus stops, to be feeders for the network; others are articulated, and can only use BRT stations.		Silver BRT certified (2013).
Johannesburg	Rea Vaya	City of Johannesburg	-	-	-	16.7 km (10.4 mi)	The 120-km Phase 1 route includes 150 stations, eight terminals, and six depots. Phase 1A, consisting of a 40-km route with 48 stations, was completed in April 2009 (before the FIFA Confederations Cup); Phase 1B added 86 km and 102 stations to the system before the 2010 World Cup. According to the city's website, the system is fully integrated with other transport networks. Rea Vaya will not compete with other transport systems, such as the South African Rail Commuter Corporation or the Gautrain. Construction on the Rivonia-Katherine Corridor and bus stations underway. The Phase 1C route will connect downtown Johannesburg with Sandton		Bronze BRT certified (2014).
Johannesburg	Harambee BRT	City of Ekurhuleni	October 2017	-	-	-			Not BRT certified in 2022.
Gqeberha	Libhongolethu IPTS	Nelson Mandela Bay	2010	-	-	-	A BRT system was implemented by Libhongolethu IPTS in the city for the 2010 World Cup. Bus lanes have been built through the city, with buses built by Marcopolo.		Not BRT certified in 2013.
Pretoria	A Re Yeng BRT	City of Tshwane	December 2014	7	12	14 km (8.7 mi)	The City of Tshwane, Construction began in July 2012, and the system was to be operational by A Re Yeng BRT bus from five in the morning to midnight.		Not BRT certified in 2015.
Rustenburg	Yarona BRT	Bojanala Platinum District Municipality	September 2022	-	-	-			Not BRT certified in 2022.
Polokwane	Leeto La Polokwane BRT	Polokwane Local Municipality	March 2021	-	-	-			Not BRT certified in 2022.
Durban	GO Durban BRT	eThekwini Metropolitan Municipality	-	-	-	-			Not BRT certified in 2024.
Bloemfontein	Hauweng IPTN	Mangaung Metropolitan Municipality	14 July 2024	3	-	-			Not BRT certified in 2024.

=== Tanzania ===
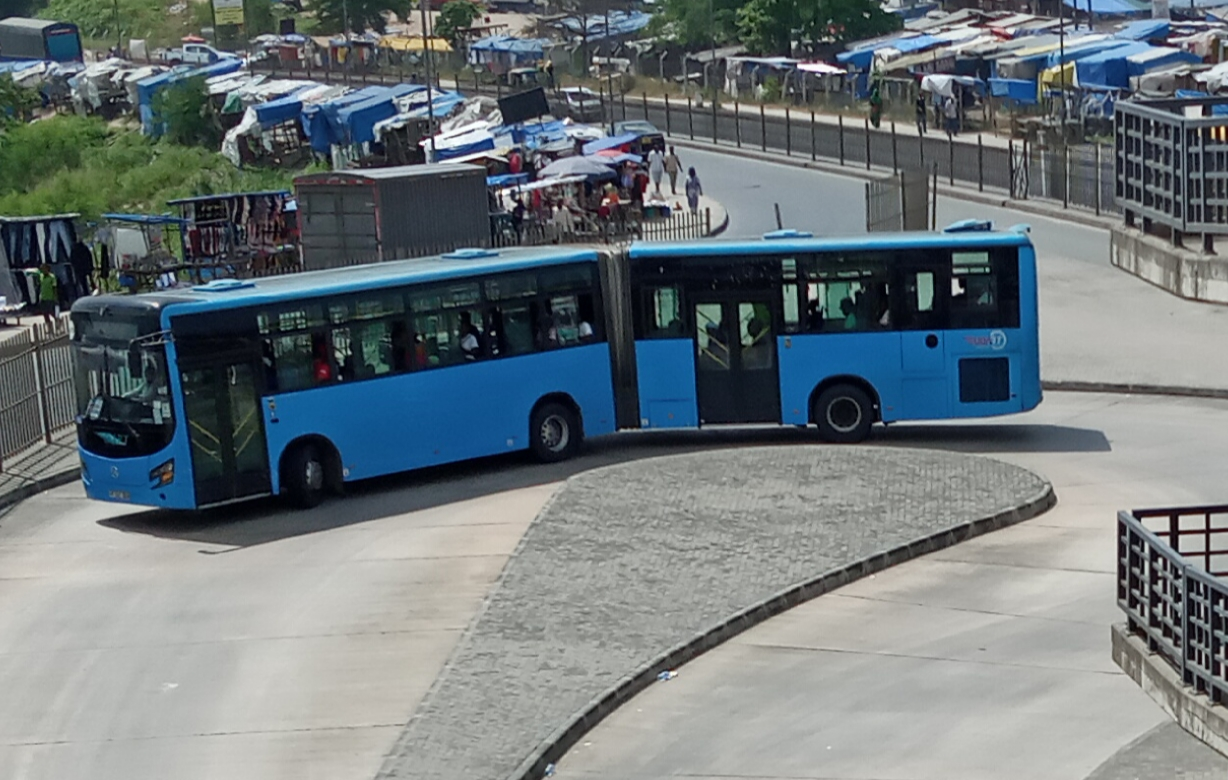
BRT bus in Dar es Salaam

BRT systems in Tanzania
City	System name	Operator	Began	Lines	Stations	Length	Notes/Description	Type	BRT certified
Dar es Salaam	UDART	UDA-RT	10 May 2016	1	29	21.1 km (13.1 mi)	The Construction of the first phase was completed in December 2015 at a total cost of €134 million funded by the African Development Bank, World Bank and the Government of Tanzania.		Not BRT certified in 2022.

=== Tunisia ===
In the following table, BRT systems in light blue are under construction.

BRT systems in Tunisia
City	System name	Operator	Began	Lines	Stations	Length	Notes/Description	Type	BRT certified
Sfax	-	-	-	-	-	-	Under construction		Not BRT certified in 2024.

=== Uganda ===
In the following table, BRT systems in light blue are under construction.

BRT systems in Uganda
City	System name	Operator	Began	Lines	Stations	Length	Notes/Description	Type	BRT certified
Kampala	Greater Kampala BRT	Tondeka Metro Bus Service (TMBS)	-	-	-	-	Under construction		
