= Dommartemont =

- Commune
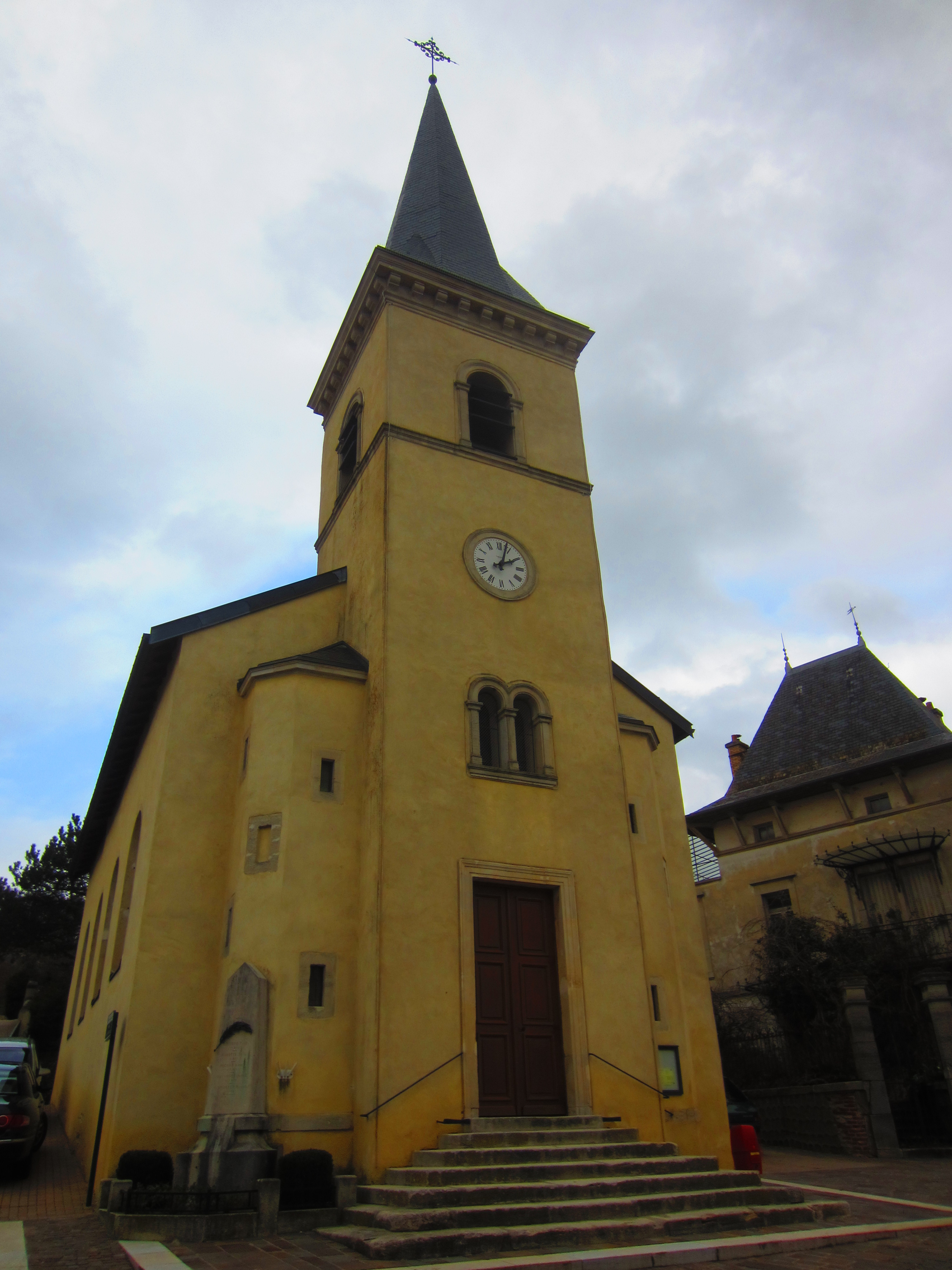
- The church in Dommartemont

- Coat of arms
- Location of Dommartemont
- Location within France Location within Grand Est
- Coordinates: 48°42′50″N 6°12′54″E
- Country: France
- Region: Grand Est
- Department: Meurthe-et-Moselle
- Arrondissement: Nancy
- Canton: Saint-Max
- Intercommunality: Métropole du Grand Nancy

Government
  - Mayor (2020–2026): Alain Liesenfelt
- Area^{1}: 1.32 km^{2} (0.51 sq mi)
- Elevation: 380 m (1,250 ft)
- Highest elevation: 375 m (1,230 ft)
- Lowest elevation: 240 m (790 ft)
- Population (2023): 566
  - Density: 429/km^{2} (1,110/sq mi)
- Time zone: UTC+01:00 (CET)
  - Summer (DST): UTC+02:00 (CEST)
- INSEE/Postal code: 54165 /54130
- ^{1} French Land Register data, which excludes lakes, ponds, glaciers > 1 km^{2} (0.386 sq mi or 247 acres) and river estuaries.

Dommartemont (French pronunciation: [dɔmaʁtəmɔ̃]) is a commune in the Meurthe-et-Moselle department in north-eastern France.

== See also ==
- Communes of the Meurthe-et-Moselle department
