= Abidjan Transport Company =

- Native name: Société des transports Abidjanais
- Type: Public Establishment
- Industry: Passenger, operations, infrastructure management and network engineering
- Founded: 1960
- Headquarters: Rue fishermen Vridi, Abidjan, Côte d'Ivoire
- Number of locations: Méité Bouaké
- Products: bus, boat-bus
- Total assets: 1610 agents
- Subsidiaries: SOTRA Tourism SOTRA Industries Institute SOTRA.
- Website: http://www.sotra.ci/

The Abidjan Transport Company (French: Société des transports Abidjanais, abbreviated SOTRA) is the public transit provider for Abidjan, Ivory Coast and its suburbs. It is the first urban transport company organized in West Africa. SOTRA is a company that manages transit through its bus and water bus fleet. This company was created on December 16, 1960, to manage all modes of surface transportation, which were previously provided by private interests. Its status is that of a mixed economy company.

== History ==
Before 1960, the public transport was made Abidjan in the traditional way with pinnaces on the lagoon and the van s brand Renault commonly called "thousand pounds" and carrying twenty passengers on a fixed route. Of cars carrying fewer than a dozen passengers on a fairly regular route and some taxi s completed means of displacement.

The 16 is created Abidjan Transport Company (SOTRA), a mixed economy company whose capital is owned 35% by the Ivorian government and 65% by private partners. SOTRA, under supervision of the Minister of Public Works and Transport, appears therefore as the first company organized urban transport of West Africa.

A concession agreement public service signed between the Ivorian government and SOTRA grants it the exclusive service transit passengers in the city of Abidjan. This agreement also provides for the removal vans called "thousand pounds" and other collective means of public transport, excluding taxis. From July 1964, the monopoly of Sotra the public transport passenger becomes effective in Abidjan. The company increases its sales so that it becomes truly beneficial when it had successive deficits experienced during the early years. The owners of taxis, which receive compensation in the form of authorizations for transmission lines on non-urban or thumbnails to operate taxis counters.

The initial capital of SOTRA 50 million in 1960 rose to 800 million in 1974 and FCFA 3 billion F CFA in 1983. It is held in 2009 by the Ivorian government (60.13%), Irisbus / Iveco (39.80%) and the District of Abidjan (0.07%).

== Organisation ==
SOTRA group is a company public financial participation of Ivorian law. It is governed principally by the Uniform Act on Commercial Companies and Economic Interest Grouping (OHADA). Its organization is based around a branch of a management audit of the general and operational management (operations management, management of human resources development, administrative and financial management, corporate communications and marketing, direction of the organization and quality management studies and prospective management of IT and new technologies, management of general resources) that three subsidiaries: SOTRA Industries Institute SOTRA SOTRA and Tourism.

== Means of production ==
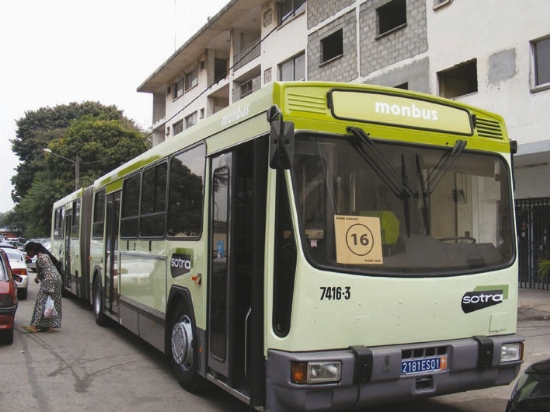
An articulated bus manufactured by SOTRA Industries.

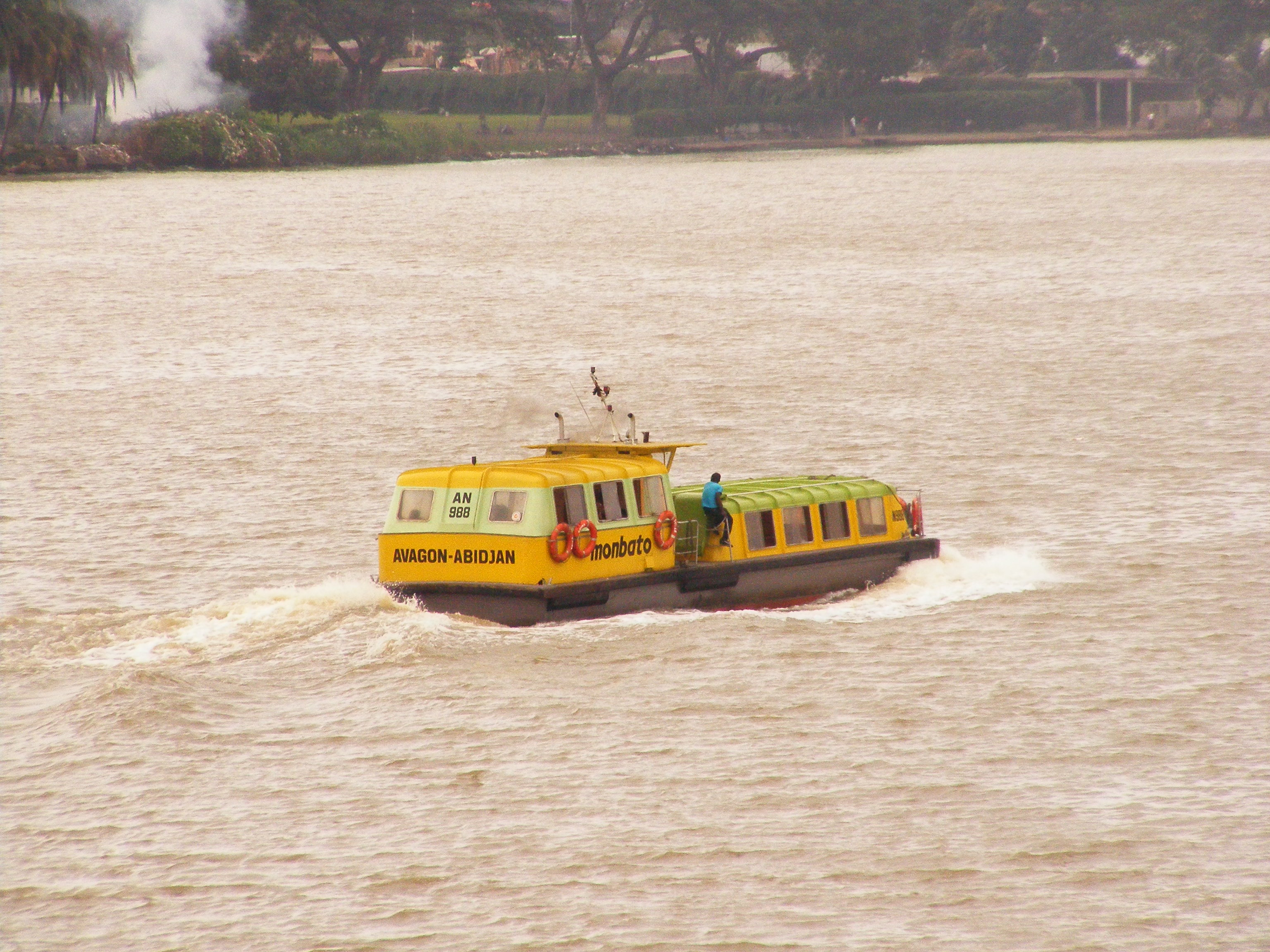
A water bus on Ébrié lagoon.

SOTRA has six service centers and vehicle line management, a maintenance shop waterbuses, a central workshop to renovate the bodywork and large bodies of vehicles, three control stations, four lagoon stations, forty-five bus terminals and 1,050, 265 breakpoints equipped shelters. The company operates 526 buses in standard mode, 145 express bus mode, 117 buses and 26 passenger boat bus.

The staff is divided among 223 managers, 355 senior technicians, 1,657 supervisors and 1,863 employees who work for a network of 68 urban routes, 12 express lines, 3 lines Waterbuses 2 lines Taxi luggage and online school. Average daily travels SOTRA 108,188 km (67,225 mi) and transports 800,000 passengers.

== Modernisation ==
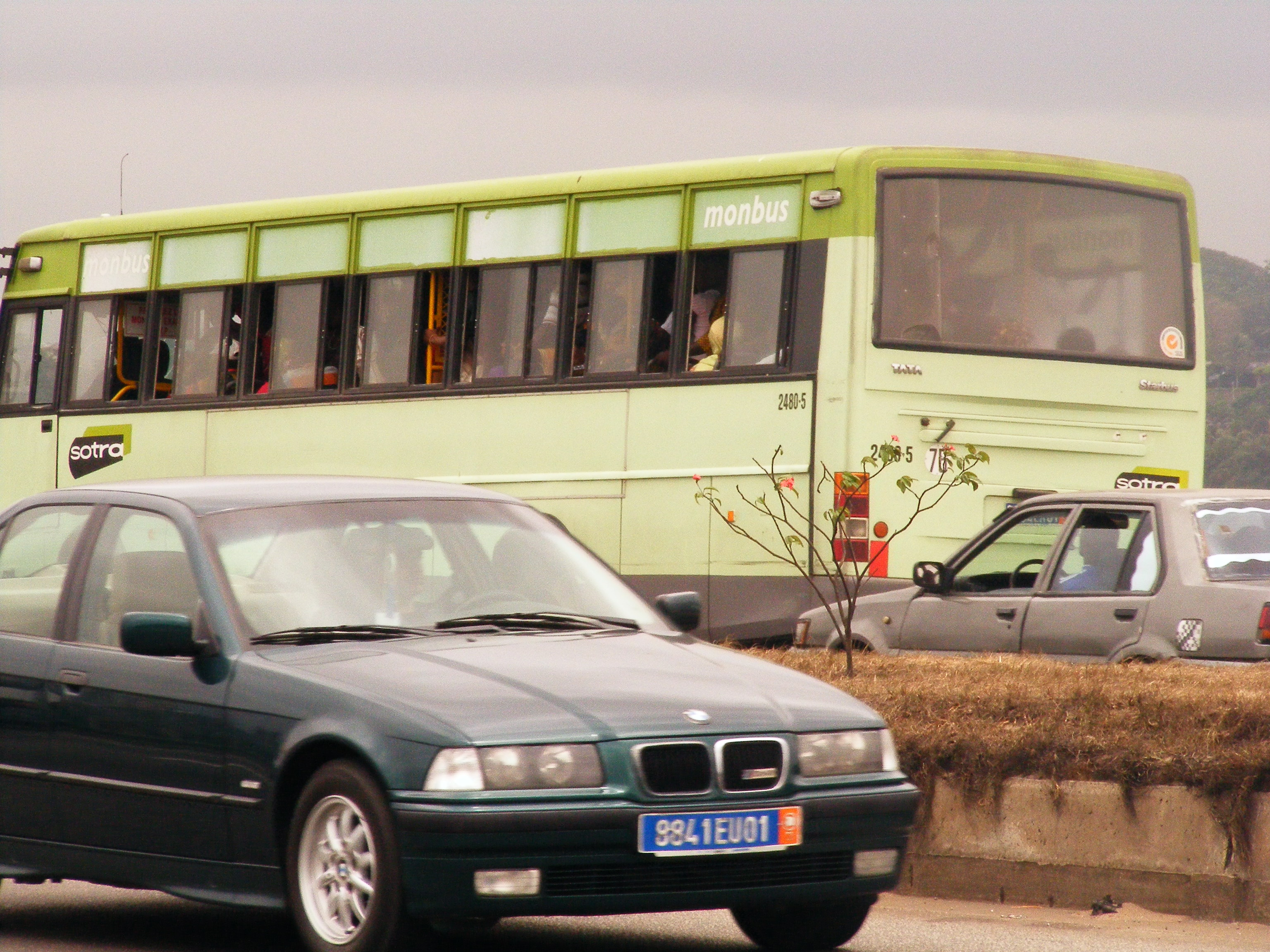
A bus Tata Motors to Abidjan in 2009. Little resistance, they are gradually replaced by newer buses.

SOTRA buses were equipped with a ticketing system computer (BAO), which is installed in buses SOTRA a mini computer or precoded console capable of emitting titles directly transport form of receipt with all the travel data (date, time, line, position ...).

From 22, buses Renault R312 and in good condition, previously used by RATP in Paris, entered service in the park SOTRA instead of bus Tata and Iran Khodro. For its part, the city of Strasbourg R312 5 bus offered to the company. In total, 300 new vehicles were promised by the Prime Minister at the time, Guillaume Soro. This renewal is part of a comprehensive plan to rehabilitate buses Abidjan and recovery of the company. The cost of the operation is estimated at 4.7 billion CFA francs.

== Tourism SOTRA ==
SOTRA Tourism & Travel is a subsidiary of SOTRA which offers trips in almost all countries around the cars, boats and airplanes by professionals tourism.

== Means of transport ==
- Bus
- Ferry boat
- Car
