= List of bus rapid transit systems in Oceania =

The term bus rapid transit system (BRT system) has been applied to a wide range of bus, trolleybus, and electric bus systems. In 2012, the Institute for Transportation and Development Policy (ITDP) published a BRT Standard to make it easier to standardize and compare bus services.

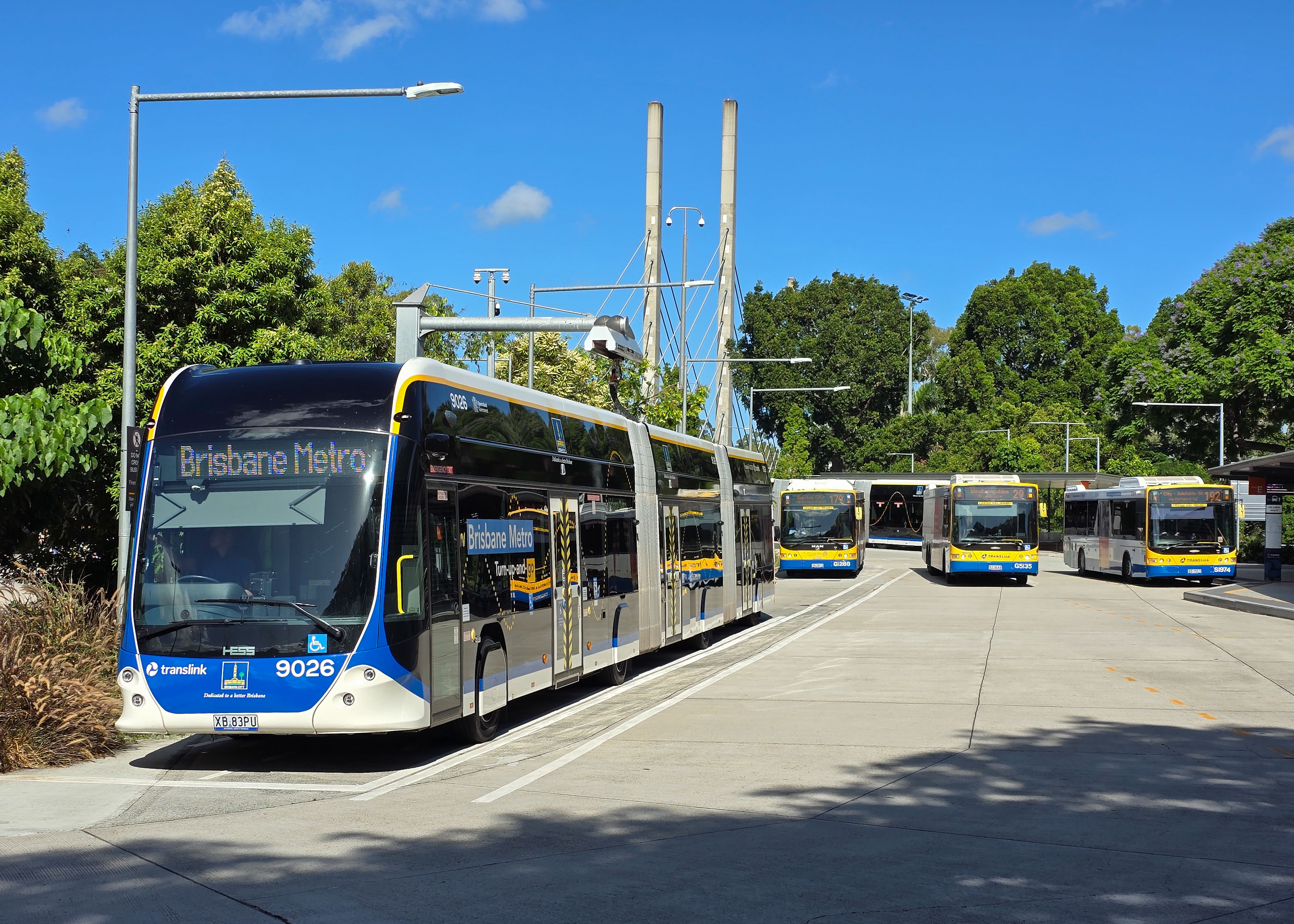
Brisbane BRT Bus HESS lighTram25, Brisbane Metro

The below list only includes BRT systems in Oceania that are in operation or under construction.

== Legend ==
Status (background color)

- White: Operational
- Light blue: Under construction

City
Primary city served by the buses and trolleybus.
System name
The English name of the bus rapid transit or overview article for city.
Operator
Operating the main bus services along its designated route.
Began
The year that the bus rapid transit began operating for passenger service.
Stations
Stations connected by transfers are counted as one station, unless otherwise note.
Length (km)
Track length; lines which share track are counted once or Corridor length; lines which sharing the same corridor are counted once.
Notes/Description
A short objective description and subjective of routes bus rapid transit ridership and passengers (daily).
Type
eBRT - Electric Bus Rapid Transit, using Trolleybuses or eBRT using Electric buses or other source.
BRT certified
ITDP standards-and-guides and bus-rapid-transit-standard year rewards.

=== Australia ===
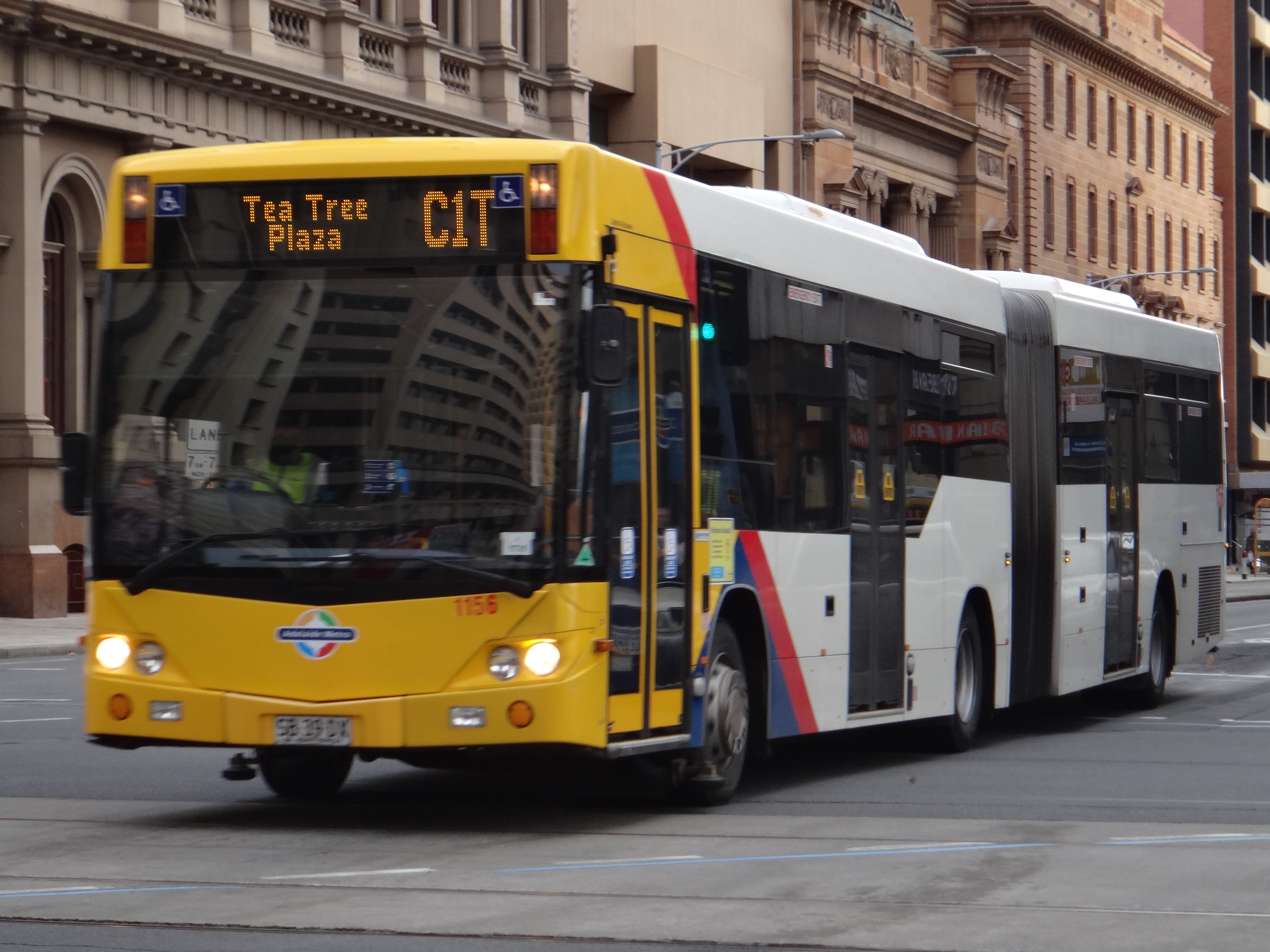
The O-Bahn Busway in Adelaide, South Australia

BRT systems in Australia
City	System name	Operator	Began	Lines	Stations	Length	Notes/Description	Type	BRT certified
Adelaide	O-Bahn Busway	Torrens Transit	9 March 1986	-	3	12 km (7.5 mi)	One of the world's longest, fastest and most heavily used guided busways.		Not BRT certified in 2013.
Brisbane	South East Busway	Transport for Brisbane, Clarks Logan City Bus Service, Mt Gravatt Bus Service, Transdev Queensland, Park Ridge Transit	13 September 2000	1	13	13.2 km (8.2 mi)	Routes are linked through an underground hub in the central business district. Busways in Brisbane carried over 70 million passengers in 2011.	Busway	Silver BRT certified (2013).
Brisbane	Northern Busway	Transport for Brisbane	23 February 2004	1	13	-	Routes are linked through an underground hub in the central business district. Busways in Brisbane carried over 70 million passengers in 2011.	Busway	Silver BRT certified (2013).
Brisbane	Eastern Busway	Transport for Brisbane	3 August 2009	1	6	-	Routes are linked through an underground hub in the central business district. Busways in Brisbane carried over 70 million passengers in 2011.	Busway	Silver BRT certified (2013).
Brisbane	Brisbane Metro	Transport for Brisbane	28 January 2025	2	18	21 km (13 mi)	Runs entirely on the South East, Northern and Eastern Busways.	eBRT electric buses	Not BRT certified in 2022.
Melbourne	SmartBus	CDC Melbourne, Kinetic Melbourne, Ventura Bus Lines	1990	9	-	-	Has elements of BRT infrastructure but uses relatively few dedicated bus lanes.		Not BRT certified in 2022.
Perth	Kwinana Freeway Bus Transitway		February 2002	-	2	5.9 kilometres (3.7 mi)	Closed in January 2006 for the construction of the Mandurah line	Busway	Not BRT certified in 2022.
Sydney	B-Line	Keolis Northern Beaches	26 November 2017	-	10	31 km (19 mi)			Not BRT certified in 2022.
Sydney	Liverpool-Parramatta T-way	Transit Systems NSW	2 February 2003	-	35	31 km (19 mi)			Not BRT certified in 2022.
Sydney	Metrobus	Hillsbus, State Transit Authority, Transdev NSW, Transit Systems NSW, U-Go Mobility	12 October 2008	13	-	-	M2 bus corridor.		Not BRT certified in 2022.
Sydney	North-West T-way	Busways, Hillsbus	10 March 2007	-	30	24 km (15 mi)	M2 bus corridor.		Not BRT certified in 2022.

=== New Caledonia ===
BRT systems in New Caledonia
City	System name	Operator	Began	Lines	Stations	Length	Notes/Description	Type	BRT certified
Nouméa	Noumea Neobus	CarSud (New Caledonia)	12 October 2019	1	23	13.3 km (8.3 mi)		eBRT electric buses	Not BRT certified in 2022.

=== New Zealand ===
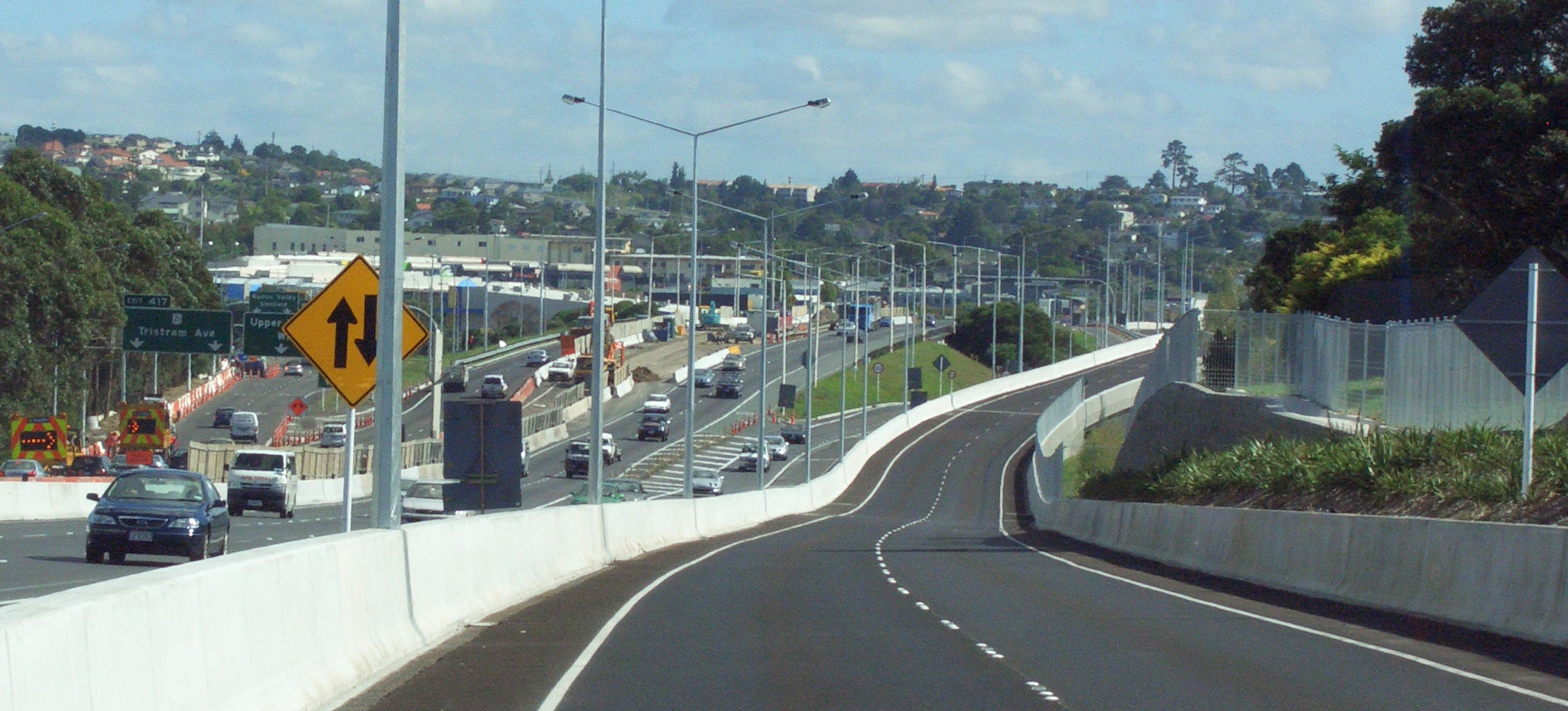
Northern Busway, North Shore, New Zealand

In the following table, BRT systems in light blue are under construction.

BRT systems in New Zealand
City	System name	Operator	Began	Lines	Stations	Length	Notes/Description	Type	BRT certified
Auckland	Northern Busway	Ritchies Transport, Tranzit Group (Tranzurban Auckland)	February 2008	-	6	11 km (6.8 mi)		Busway	Not BRT certified in 2013.
Auckland	Eastern Busway	Kinetic Group (Go Bus), Howick & Eastern Buses	December 2021	-	6	7 km (4.3 mi)	Stage 1 operational (Panmure to Pakuranga) Stage 2 under construction (Pakuranga to Botany)	Busway	Not BRT certified in 2013.
Auckland	Northwest Busway – Te Ara Hauāuru	Tranzit Group (Tranzurban Auckland)	-	-	7	18 km (11 mi)	Planned	Busway	Not BRT certified in 2013.
Auckland	Airport to Botany Bus Rapid Transit	-	-	-	-	18 km (11 mi)	Proposed	Busway	Not BRT certified in 2013.
