= Malzéville =

- Commune
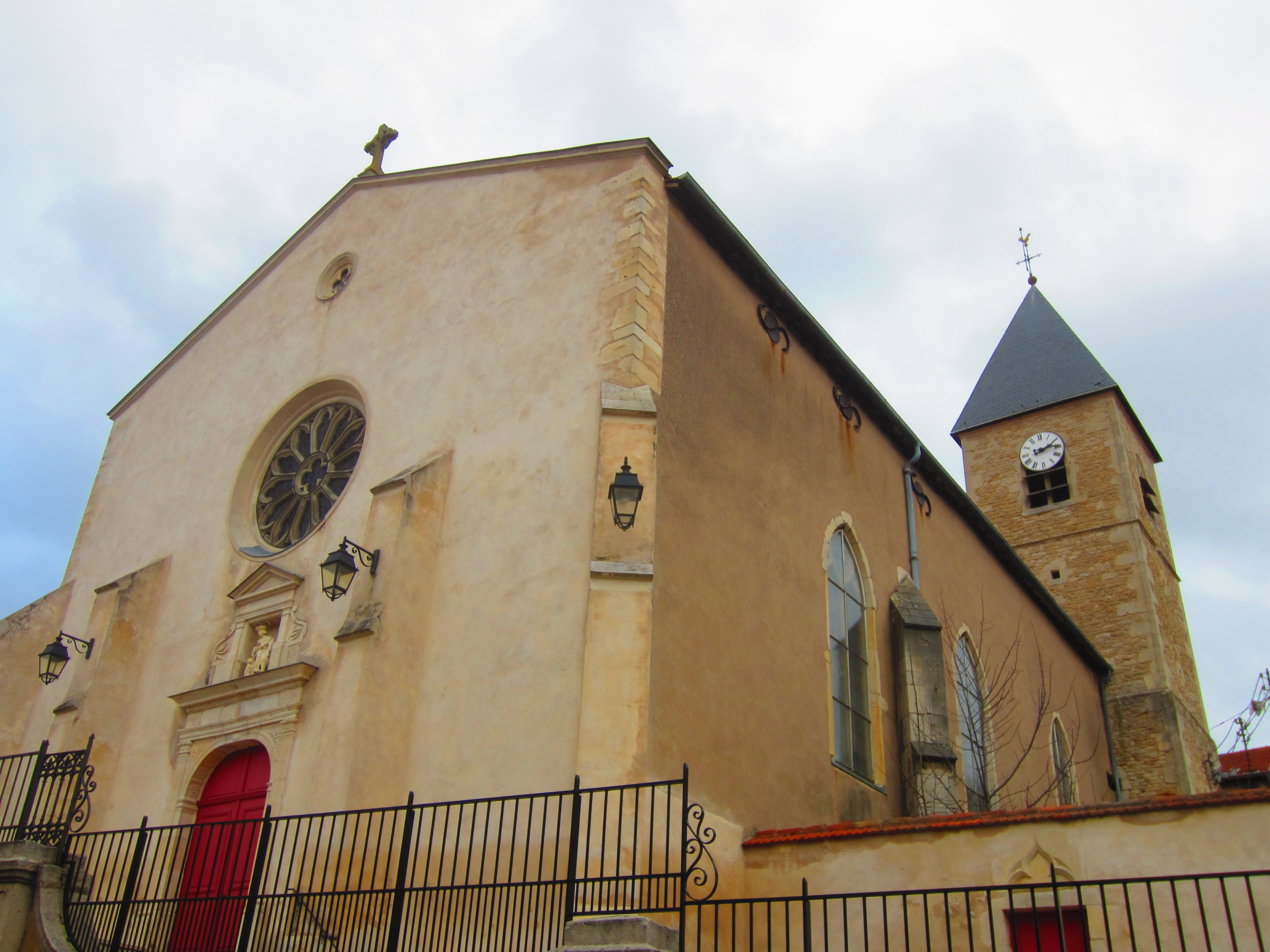
- The church in Malzéville

- Coat of arms
- Location of Malzéville
- Location within France Location within Grand Est
- Coordinates: 48°42′40″N 6°11′14″E
- Country: France
- Region: Grand Est
- Department: Meurthe-et-Moselle
- Arrondissement: Nancy
- Canton: Saint-Max
- Intercommunality: Métropole du Grand Nancy

Government
  - Mayor (2020–2026): Bertrand Kling
- Area^{1}: 7.53 km^{2} (2.91 sq mi)
- Elevation: 210 m (690 ft)
- Highest elevation: 384 m (1,260 ft)
- Lowest elevation: 187 m (614 ft)
- Population (2023): 7,820
  - Density: 1,040/km^{2} (2,690/sq mi)
- Time zone: UTC+01:00 (CET)
  - Summer (DST): UTC+02:00 (CEST)
- INSEE/Postal code: 54339 /54220
- ^{1} French Land Register data, which excludes lakes, ponds, glaciers > 1 km^{2} (0.386 sq mi or 247 acres) and river estuaries.

Malzéville (French pronunciation: [malzevil]) is a commune in the Meurthe-et-Moselle department in north-eastern France.

== Population ==
Historical population
Year	Pop.	±% p.a.
1968	8,725	—
1975	8,432	−0.49%
1982	8,325	−0.18%
1990	8,090	−0.36%
1999	7,712	−0.53%
2007	8,099	+0.61%
2012	8,044	−0.14%
2017	8,125	+0.20%
2023	7,820	−0.64%
Source: INSEE

== Points of interest ==
- Arboretum de l'Abiétinée

== See also ==
- Communes of the Meurthe-et-Moselle department
