= Essey-lès-Nancy =

- Commune
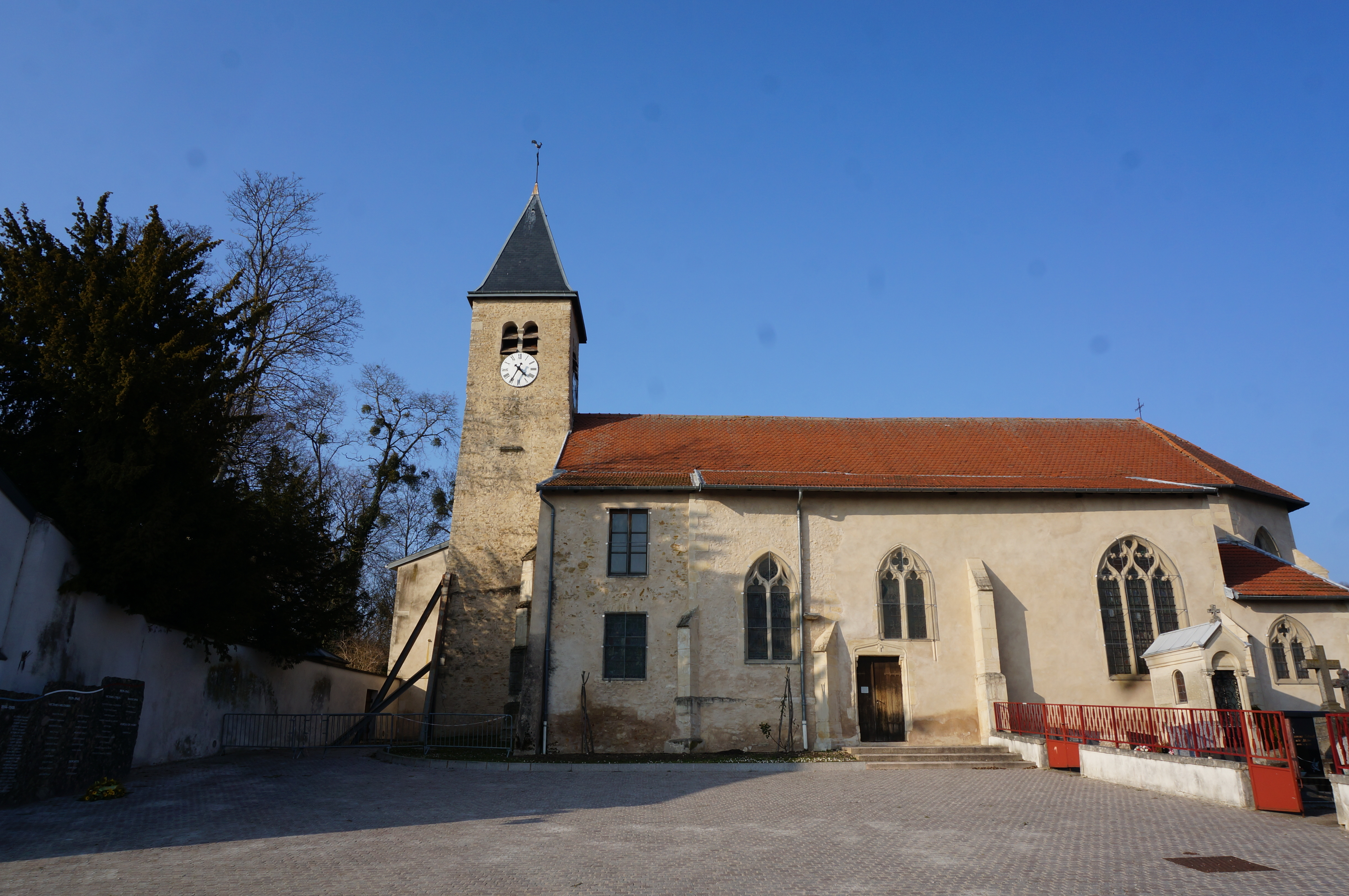
- The church in Essey-lès-Nancy

- Coat of arms
- Location of Essey-lès-Nancy
- Location within France Location within Grand Est
- Coordinates: 48°42′24″N 6°13′23″E
- Country: France
- Region: Grand Est
- Department: Meurthe-et-Moselle
- Arrondissement: Nancy
- Canton: Saint-Max
- Intercommunality: Métropole du Grand Nancy

Government
  - Mayor (2020–2026): Michel Breuille
- Area^{1}: 5.745 km^{2} (2.218 sq mi)
- Highest elevation: 363 m (1,191 ft)
- Lowest elevation: 199 m (653 ft)
- Population (2023): 8,670
  - Density: 1,510/km^{2} (3,910/sq mi)
- Demonym(s): Ascéens, Ascéennes
- Time zone: UTC+01:00 (CET)
  - Summer (DST): UTC+02:00 (CEST)
- INSEE/Postal code: 54184 /54270
- Website: www.mairie-essey-les-nancy.fr
- ^{1} French Land Register data, which excludes lakes, ponds, glaciers > 1 km^{2} (0.386 sq mi or 247 acres) and river estuaries.

Essey-lès-Nancy (French pronunciation: [esɛ lɛ nɑ̃si], literally Essey near Nancy) is a commune in the Meurthe-et-Moselle department in north-eastern France.

== Population ==
Historical population
Year	Pop.	±% p.a.
1968	4,660	—
1975	7,480	+6.99%
1982	7,447	−0.06%
1990	7,378	−0.12%
1999	7,310	−0.10%
2007	7,527	+0.37%
2012	8,653	+2.83%
2017	8,823	+0.39%
2023	8,670	−0.29%
Source: INSEE

== See also ==
- Communes of the Meurthe-et-Moselle department
