= Shopping City =

Shopping City may refer to:

- Runcorn Shopping City, a shopping centre in Cheshire, England
- The Mall Wood Green, a shopping centre in north London, England
- Salford Shopping Centre, formerly Salford Shopping City
- Shopping City (television programme), a British consumer survey television programme
