= Southgate Estate =

Former brutalist housing development in Runcorn, England

Coordinates: 53.324°N 2.702°W

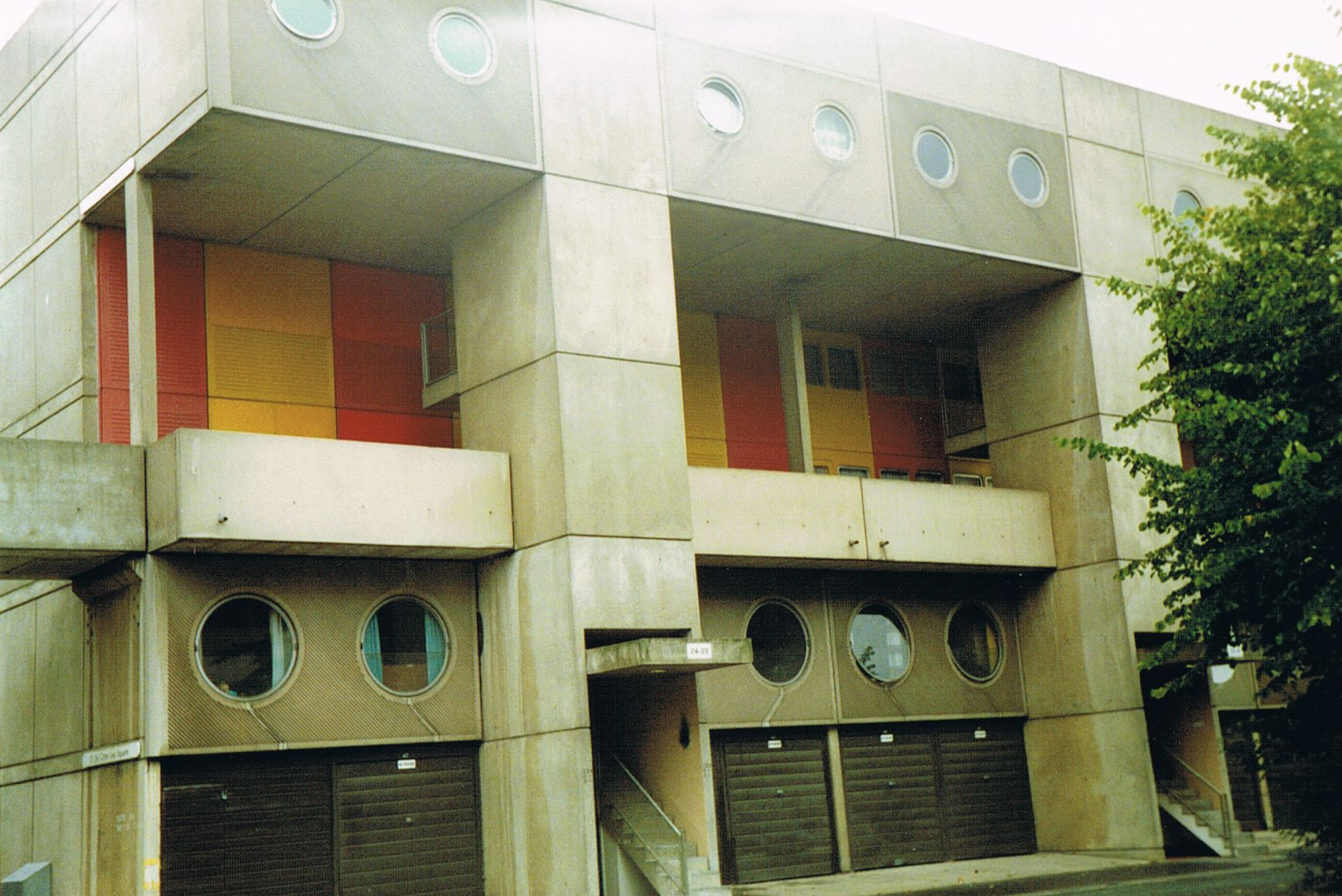
Southgate Estate in August 1989

The Southgate Estate was a modernist public housing project located in Runcorn New Town (Cheshire, England) and completed in 1977. The estate was designed by James Stirling, and comprised 1,500 residential units intended to house 6,000 people. The estate was demolished between 1990 and 1992 and replaced with another housing development, known as Hallwood Park, based around more traditional design principles.

The cladding materials employed led to the estate being colloquially known as "Legoland".

== Design ==
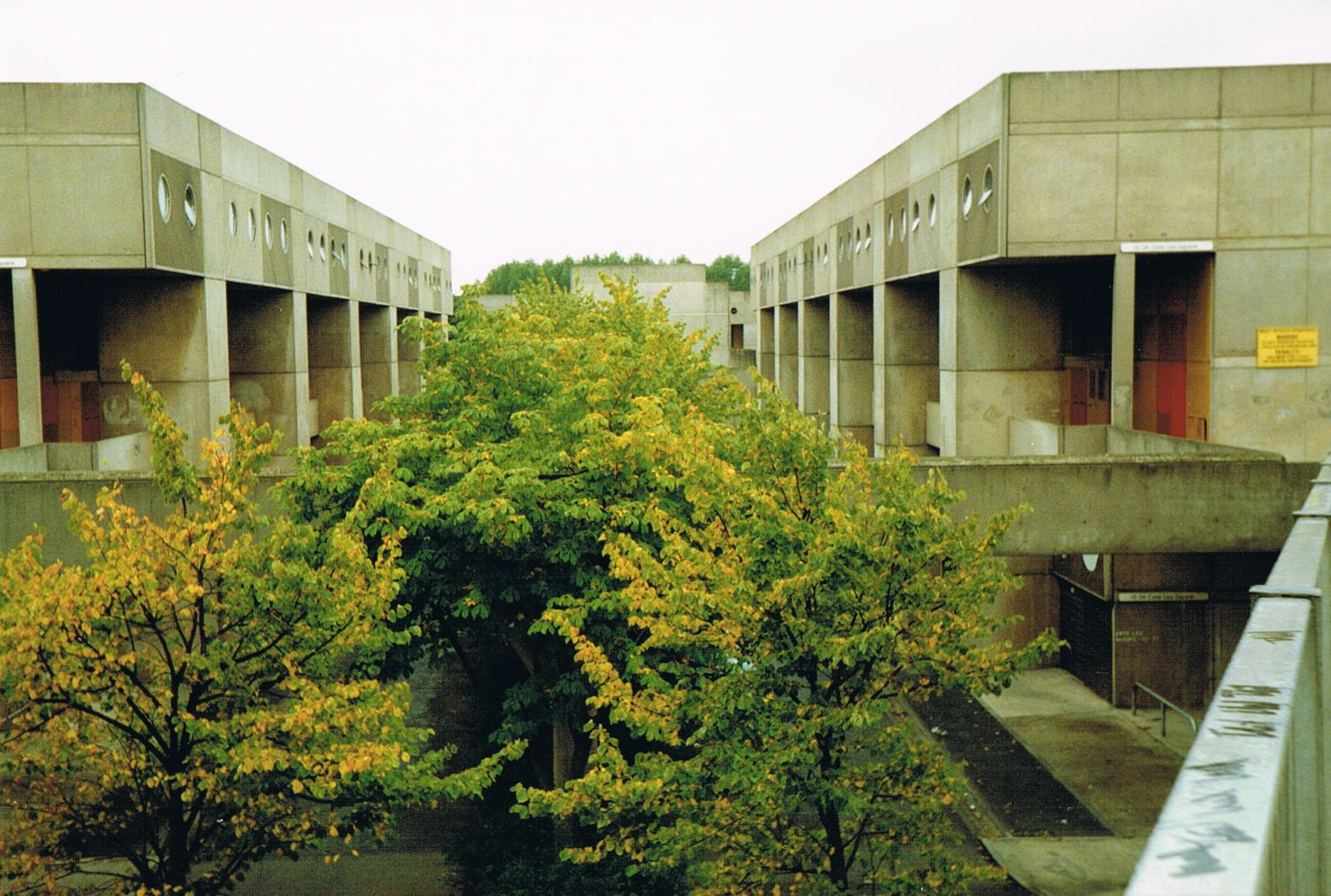
Southgate Estate in August 1989

The design brief for Southgate asked for formal streets and squares, citing the Georgian city of Bath. Instead, architect James Stirling devised a radical new housing type. The estate comprised a combination of deck-access apartment blocks, mainly located at its northern end, along with flat-roofed terraced housing at its southern end. The estate was connected by a pedestrian bridge linking the complex of deck-access flats to the nearby Shopping City development (later Halton Lea, now Runcorn Shopping City), which was intended as the New Town centre and, at the time of its completion, was one of the largest covered shopping centres in Europe.

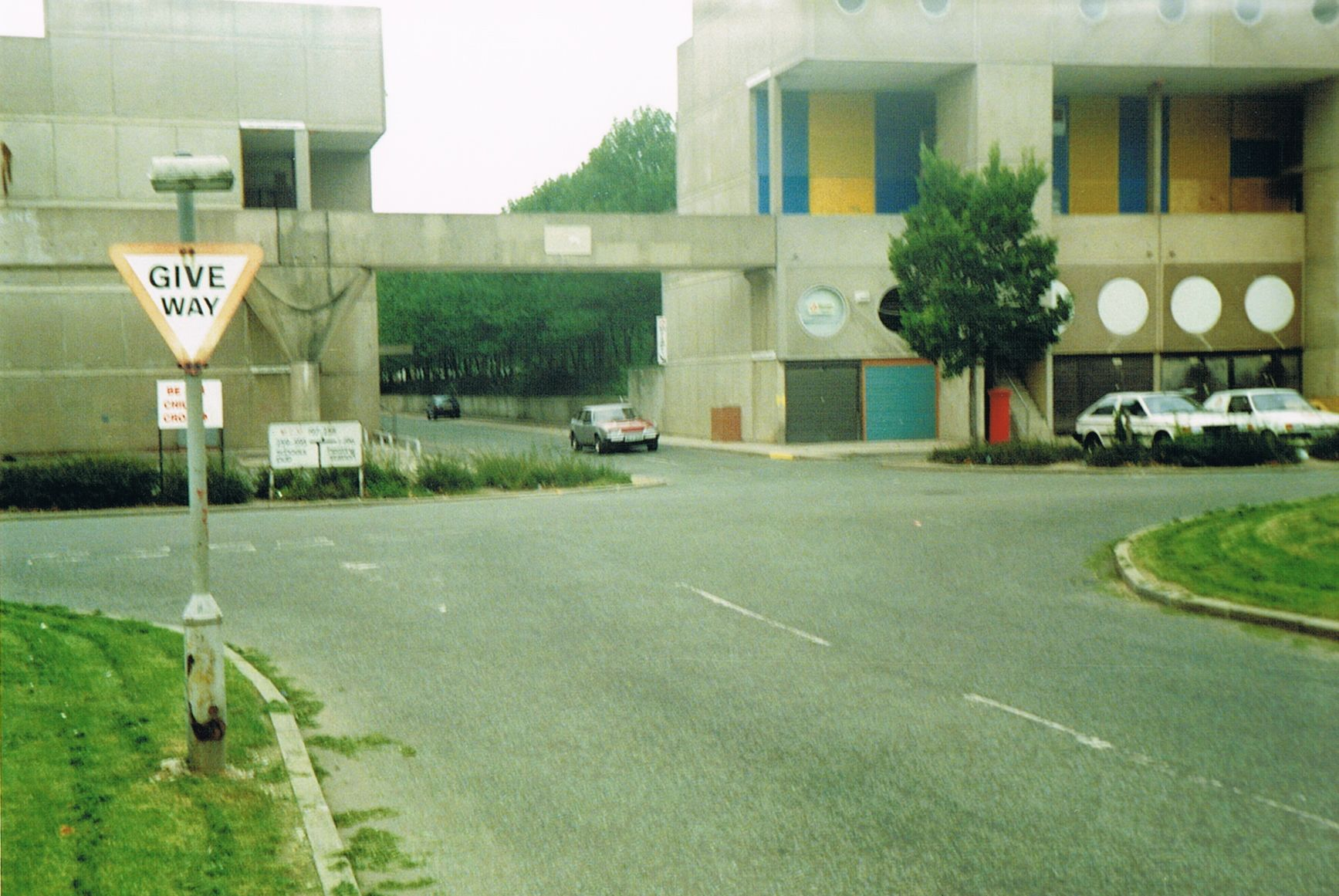
Southgate Estate in August 1989

The apartment blocks were connected to one another by a network of raised walkways following the "streets in the sky" principle, separating pedestrian access from the system of vehicular access roads located to the front of the blocks at ground level. The apartment blocks were constructed of pre-cast concrete panelling along with colourful GRP cladding and were arranged around landscaped squares, some of which included children's parks.

The blocks were formed of three types of dwelling: at ground and first floor levels, the blocks were formed of 3–5 bedroom duplex family homes; at second and third floor levels, smaller duplex family homes located off the raised pedestrian access decks; and at fourth floor level, single storey penthouse flats. The fronts of the blocks included car parking garages along with a series of stairwell towers providing access to the upper floors. The most notable design features on the fronts of the blocks were the large, circular windows and plastic panelling, which related to the fronts of the upper level duplexes. The rear of the blocks, which generally enclosed the landscaped squares, had private gardens at ground floor level along with balconies to the upper level duplexes and penthouses. The rear of the blocks also included large round windows.

The design inspiration of the estate's layout were the Georgian squares of the Cities of Bath and Edinburgh, whilst the large round windows were intended by James Stirling to reflect the maritime roots of the estate's intended inhabitants, being drawn mainly from Merseyside. The blocks were colloquially referred to as "washing machines".

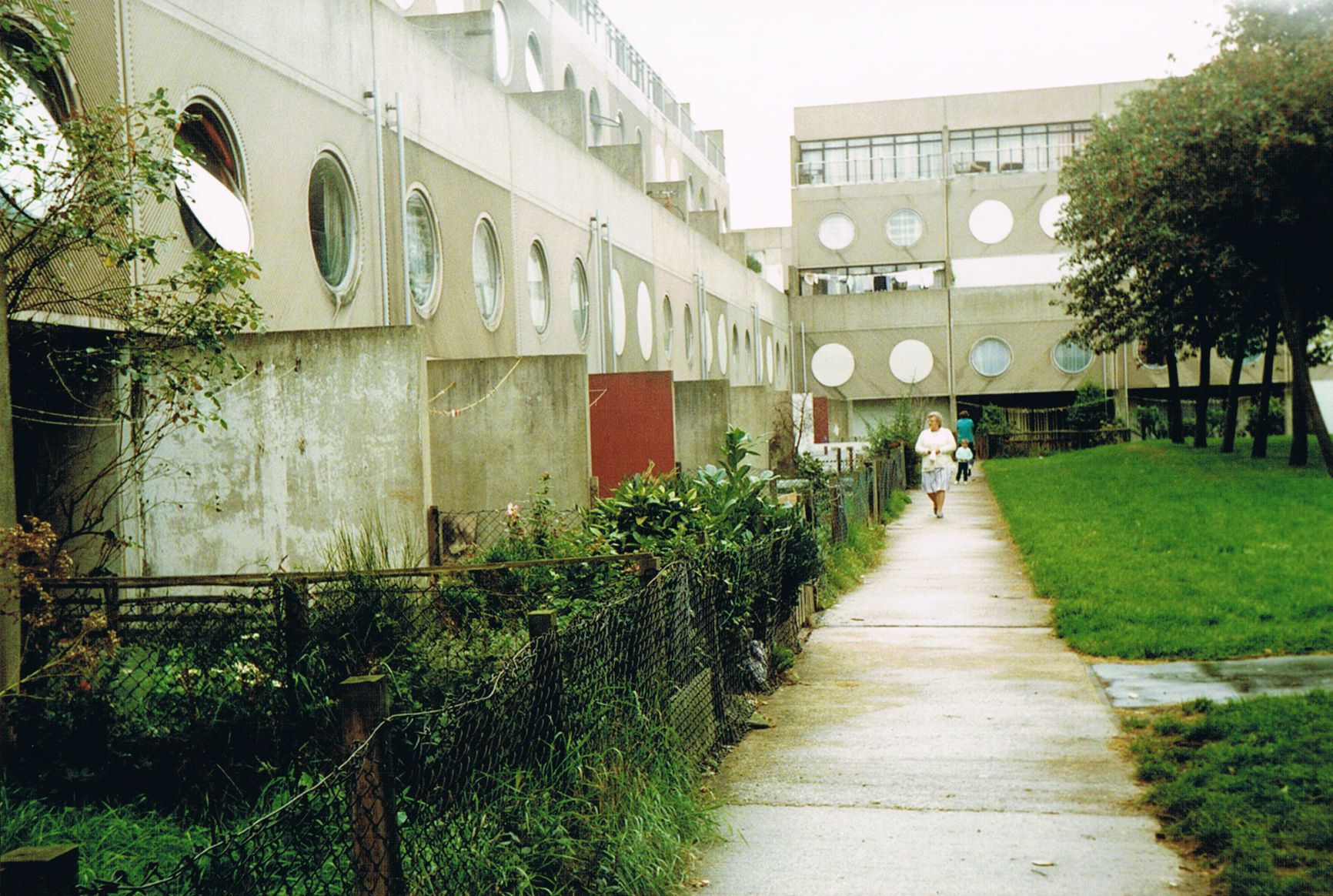
Southgate Estate in August 1989

The two and three-storey, flat-roofed, terraced houses were clad in blue, green, and orange plastic panels and included the large round windows seen in the apartment blocks. The cladding materials employed led to the estate being colloquially known as "Legoland".

The estate included a primary school at its south eastern end along with a nursery at deck level within the complex of flatted buildings. As discussed, the estate was served by a communal, oil fired heating system and was served by landscaped open spaces located in amongst the buildings. The estate was connected to the nearby shopping complex, but was not otherwise served by local shops, which could be problematic for the estate's inhabitants as Shopping City would close in the evenings and on Sundays. The estate was served by a public house. Construction had commenced on a church but this was never completed.

In 1977 architectural writer Sutherland Lyall described the finished estate as follows: "There is a nice, colourful, cheap and cheerful air about in the squares which are mostly planted out in grids of trees... In the squares the brightly coloured GRP more or less comes off. Deliberate or not it is two fingers to the bureaucrats who insist that architecture should be dignified and banal and colourless... But behind the back it is straight Butlins: long rows of corrugated plastic walls with the occasional service pipe running up the walls and across gaps between rows of houses." Writer and social historian Colin Ward was considerably more critical: In Episode 3 of the 1979 BBC documentary series Where We Live Now, subtitled "New Home, New Town", Ward visited and discussed four new towns, one of which was Runcorn. He described Southgate as "a colossal ego trip by the architect (James Stirling)" and "a romanticised version of the Machine Age", before adding drily "But, like James Stirling, I don't live there."

== Demolition ==
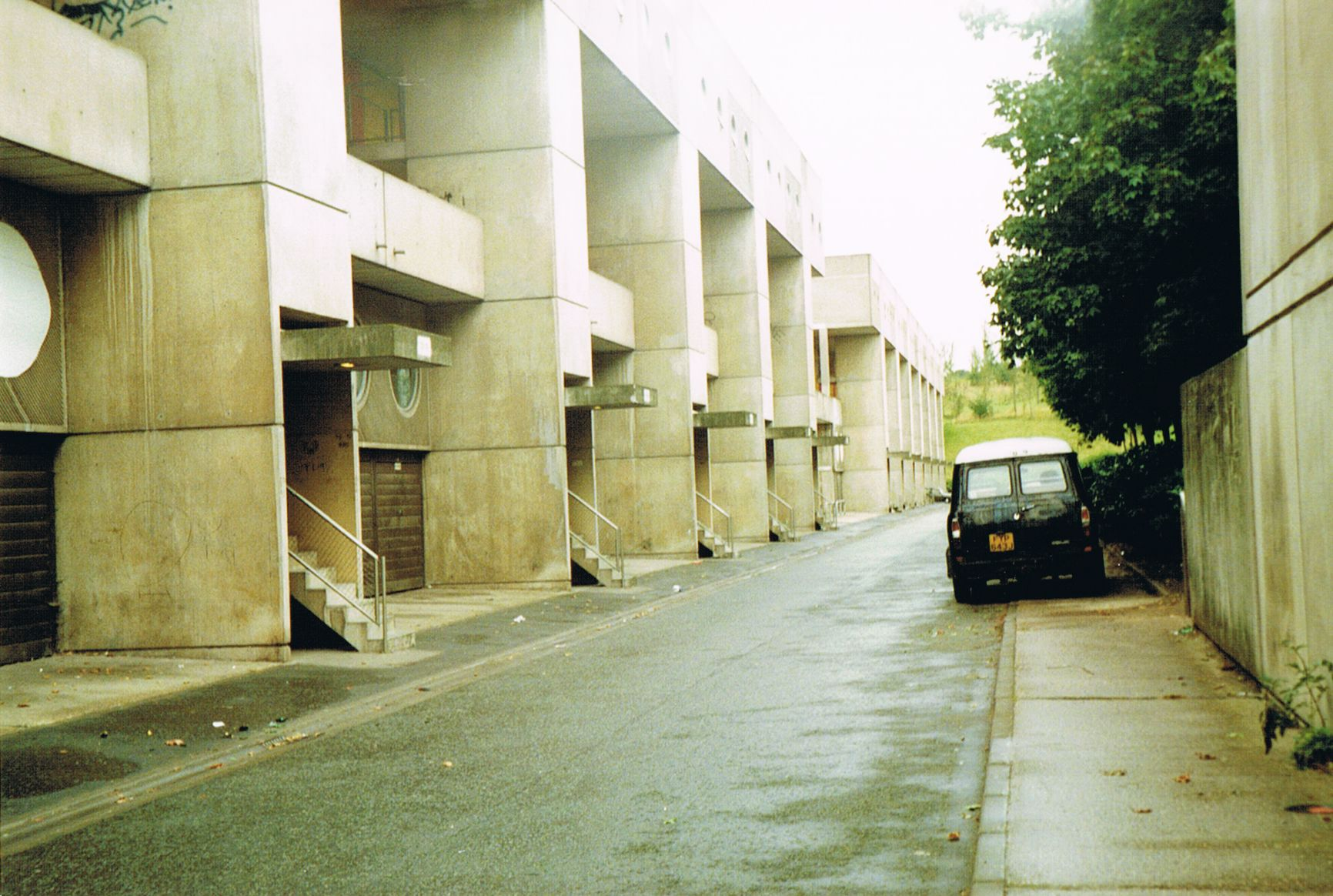
Southgate Estate in August 1989

From its inception, the project had been beset with problems and by the mid 1980s was described as being "a mess".

The choice of an oil-fired, communal heating system proved to be an expensive one as the global oil crisis of the late 1970s led to spiraling heating costs for the occupants of the development, a number of whom could not afford to heat their homes. This led to a proliferation of damp problems within the development.

The blocks of flats were particularly problematic. The deck-access design and repetitive use of stairwell towers, where there was an absence of natural surveillance, encouraged criminal activity, and made the control of these problems very difficult. Occupants complained of anti-social behaviour; high rental and heating costs; impact noise entering their homes resulting from use of the pedestrian access decks; an inability to personalise the exterior of their homes; an absence of private garden spaces for the mid-level family duplexes; remoteness from local shopping and public transport facilities; and pollution from the oil-fired power plant. Moreover, the radical and harsh appearance of the development was not to the tastes of many residents who preferred the more traditional housing built elsewhere in the New Town. The combination of these factors led to a significant proportion of the estate's families leaving the development to be replaced by younger, single people, which often exacerbated the problems. A large number of homes were left vacant and these became prone to vandalism. The estate's condition deteriorated throughout the 1980s and by 1989, the Development Corporation took the decision to demolish and replace the estate, despite it being barely 15 years old.

It was demolished in 1990.

== Legacy ==
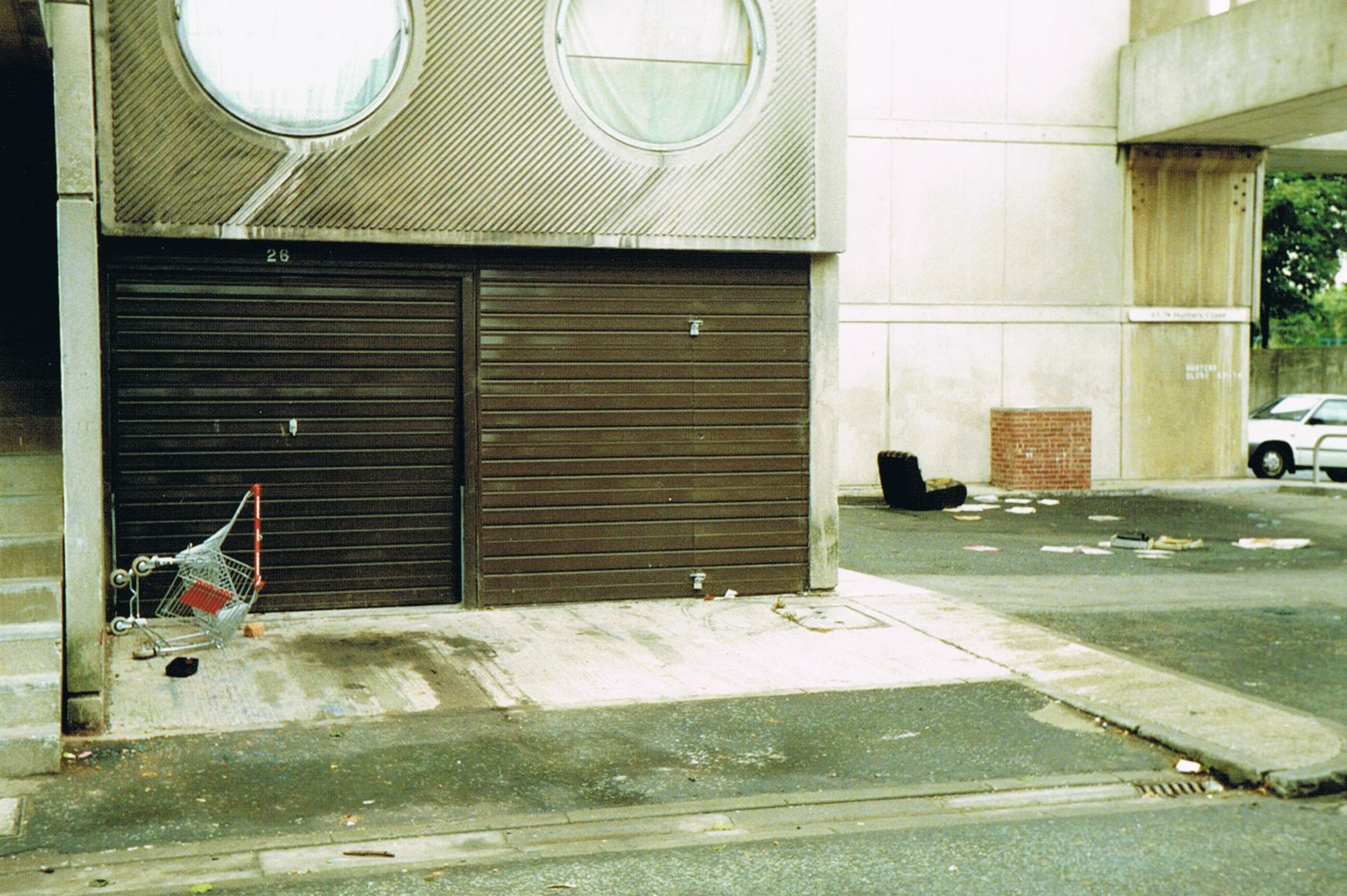
Southgate Estate in August 1989

The problems experienced at the Southgate Estate were typical of modernist housing developments built in Europe and North America during the post-war period, particularly those employing the deck-access principle.

Owing to a contractual obligation between the Urban Development Corporation (responsible for the New Town's development), and the developers of Shopping City, there was a need to provide a given volume of housing units in close proximity to the new shopping centre to aid the centre's commercial viability. Time and cost constraints along with physical limitations at the site led to the use of industrialised, mass building techniques. It has been argued that the layout and design were too dense and "harsh" for the development's intended purpose as a community housing families. Some have questioned whether the architect's radical design, incorporating garish plastic panelling, pre-cast concrete panels, and large porthole windows, was ever likely to be appropriate for use as family housing in a small town located in the plains of northern Cheshire.

Stirling, the architect, later argued that the Development Corporation, whilst adopting his architectural concept, deviated from the intended design for reasons of cost and time savings. He also suggested the developer and contractor did not share his commitment to quality.

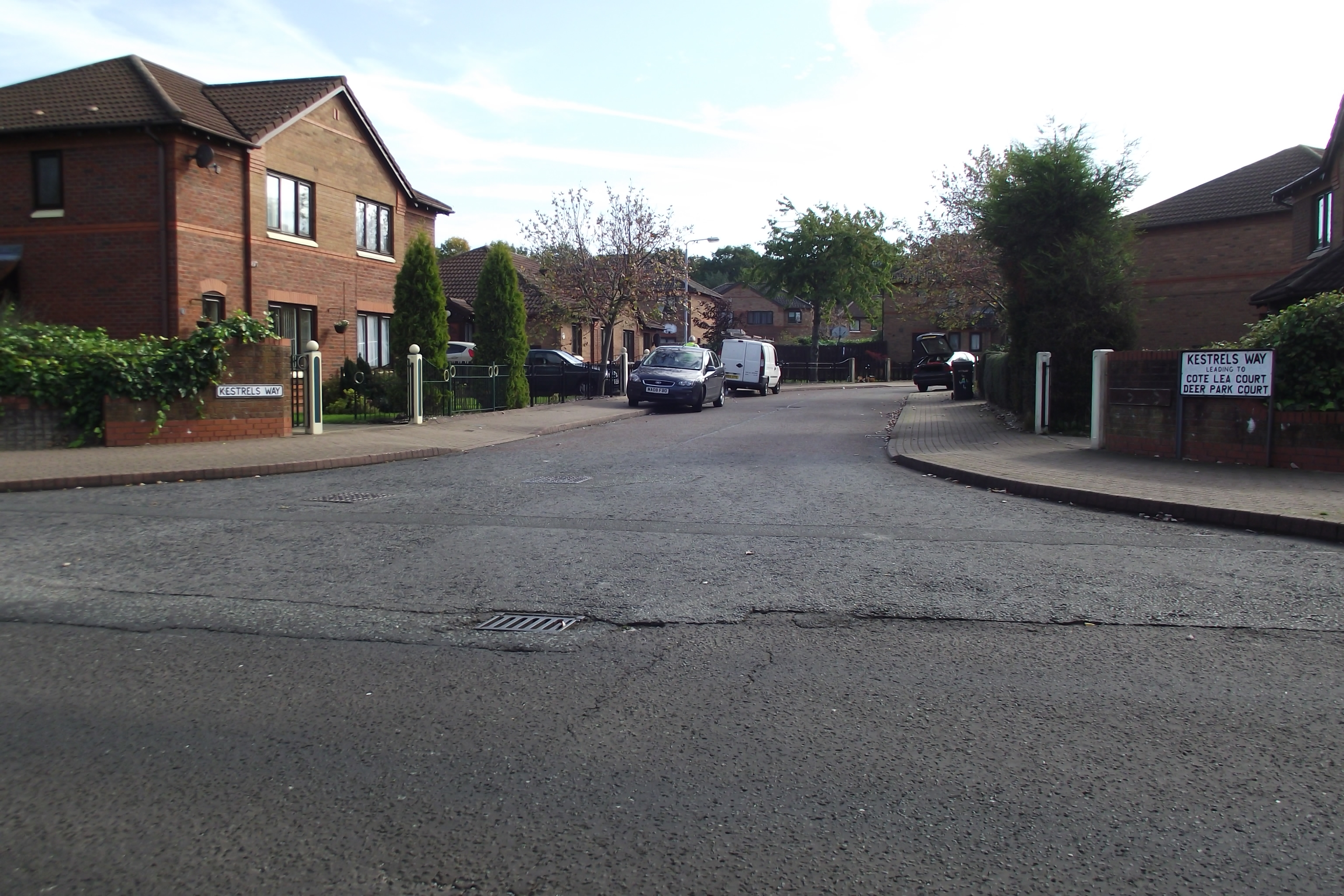
Hallwood Park, Runcorn

The original estate was subsequently replaced by a housing development called Hallwood Park, which was designed and laid out in accordance with more traditional planning and architectural concepts. The homes are primarily two-storey, semi-detached, pitch roofed dwellings constructed of brick and located within landscaped cul de sacs. The new estate was built at the same time as Southgate was demolished, and both processes were completed by 1992. Hallwood Park, which was constructed by Merseyside Improved Houses, is now a number of years older than its predecessor estate was at the time of demolition and, according to surveys, is considered to be a success amongst its residents.

Singer Melanie C, known as Sporty Spice, grew up on the estate.

== See also ==
- Pruitt–Igoe – a large urban housing project in the city of St. Louis, Missouri, demolished in the mid-1970s.
