= Runcorn Shopping City =

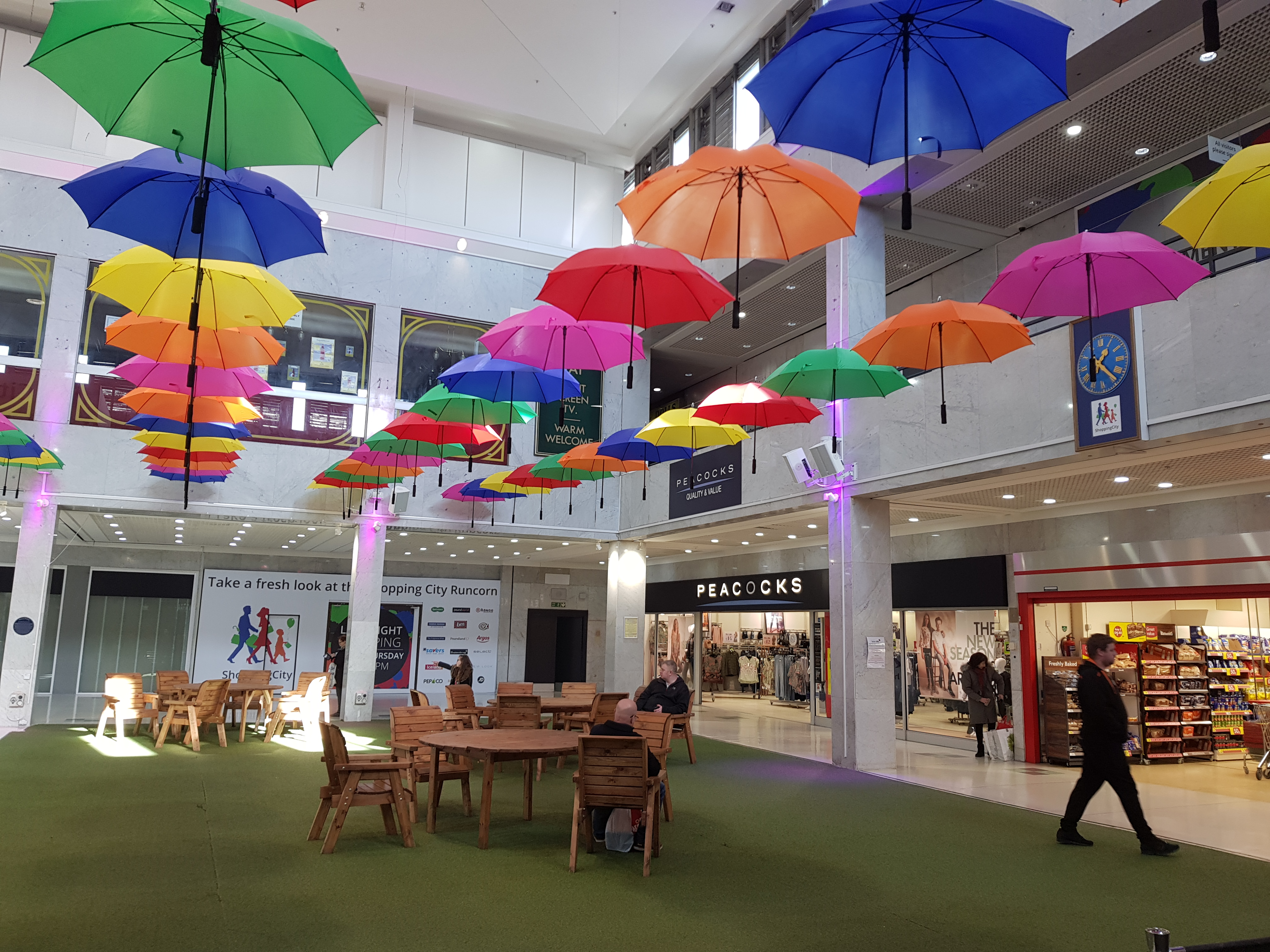
- Runcorn Shopping City's "Town Square"
- Location: Runcorn, England
- Coordinates: 53.3273°N 2.6981°W
- Opened: 5 May 1972
- Developer: Grosvenor Group
- Manager: Savills
- Architect: Fred Roche
- Floor area: 545,082 sq ft (50,639.8 m^{2})
- Floors: 3
- Parking: 2,200
- Website: shopping-city.co.uk

Runcorn Shopping City (formerly Halton Lea and Runcorn Shopping Centre) is a medium-sized indoor shopping centre in Runcorn, England. Opened by Queen Elizabeth II in 1972, it is the main shopping area in Runcorn and is visited around 6.5 million times per year. It was the largest enclosed shopping centre in Europe at the time of its construction and remains the largest in Cheshire.

== History ==
=== Design and construction ===
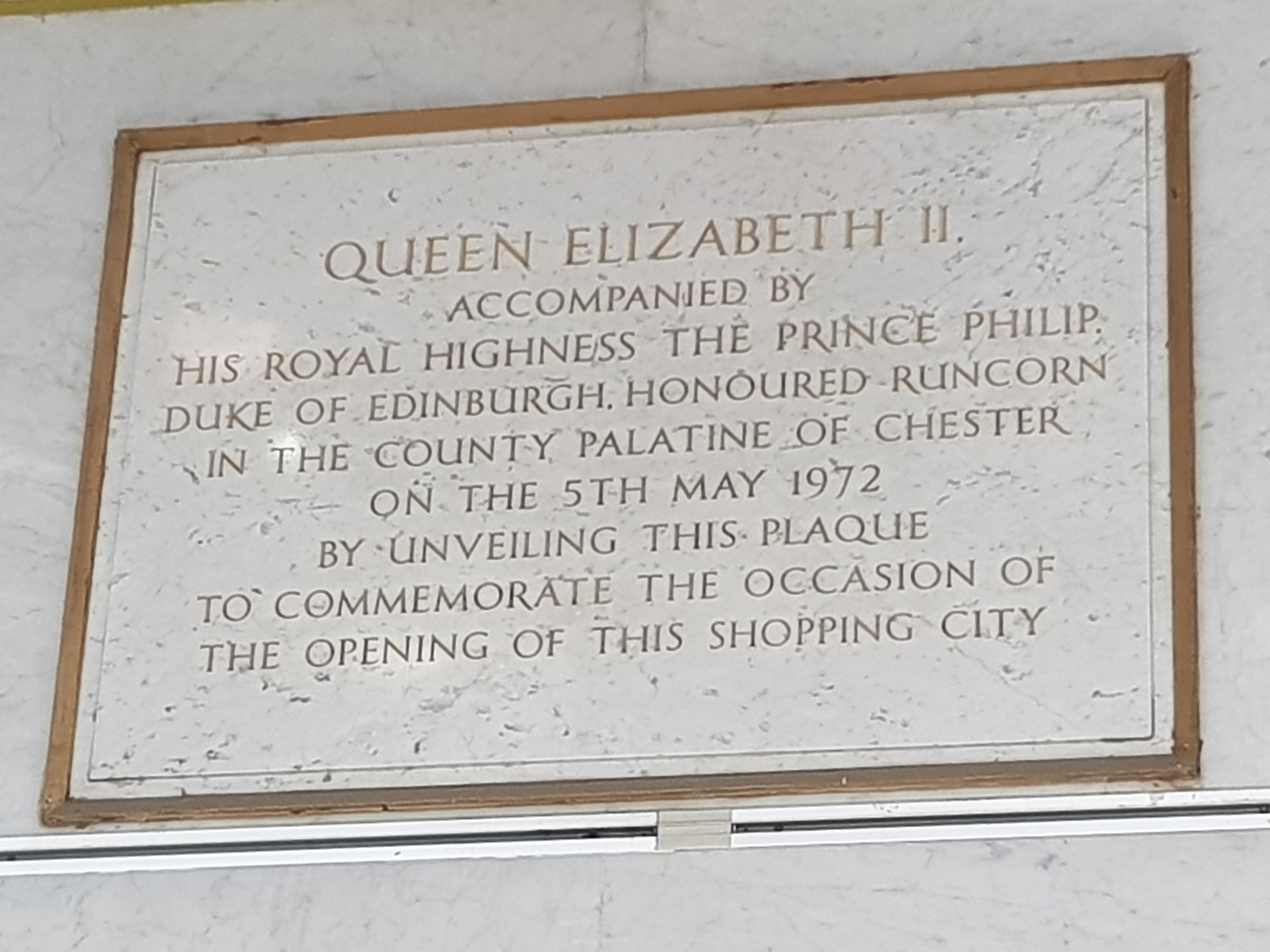
Plaque marking the centre's official opening by Queen Elizabeth II in 1972

Runcorn was designated as a New Town in 1964 and a masterplan drawn up which would see the town more than double in size. The site of the town centre for Runcorn New Town was a source of conflict between Arthur Ling, the New Town Master Planner, and Fred Roche, Chief Architect. Whereas Ling envisaged a centre reminiscent of a citadel or acropolis at the base of Halton Castle and at the geographical centre of the expanded town, Roche preferred to redevelop the existing town centre, partly to placate the Urban District Council and existing traders. Ling's vision was favoured and a greenfield site near Halton Village was chosen. Shopping City was to be the centrepiece of Runcorn New Town, and Ling envisaged that it would become the "natural meeting place for the town's social and cultural life as well as for shopping, offices and specialised amenities such as theatre, library, central sports hall etc."

Roche's design was influenced by the fully enclosed, drive-in shopping malls that had begun to emerge in North America in the 1960s. The design is of a modular megastructure, with an alternating grid of 108 by 108 feet (33 m × 33 m) square hip roofs supported by 18 by 18 feet (5.5 m × 5.5 m) service towers. The former gives large spans and allows for flexible shop space without columns, and the latter is for services and vertical access points. The building is raised on columns, partly to tackle the valley-like topography, but also to allow the segregation of cars, buses and pedestrians on three different levels. Vehicles arrive at ground level, giving access to the four multi-storey car parks on each corner for customers and to the shop basements for deliveries; pedestrians arrive at the shopping level using elevated walkways from neighbouring estates, such as the radical but ill-fated Southgate Estate; and buses arrive at the highest level on two elevated sections of the Runcorn Busway, the world's first bus rapid transit system, which circles the town in a figure of 8 with Shopping City at the centre. The centre has two integrated bus stations; one to the north and another to the south. The area to the north of the centre was intended for civic use and includes a library, police station and local government offices, all integrated into the shopping floor level. The area to the south was reserved for an envisaged southern expansion intended for leisure use.

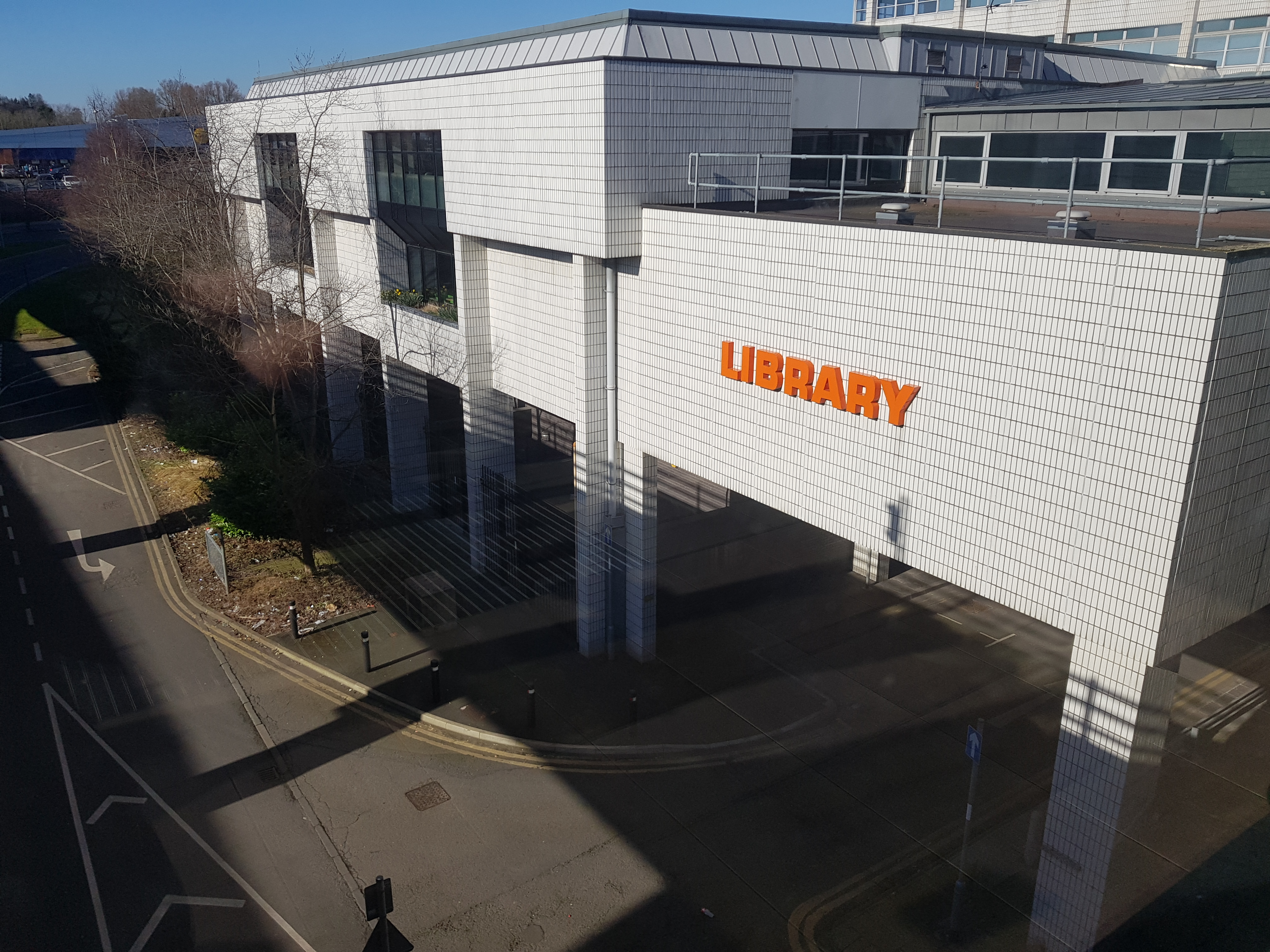
Halton Lea Library adjoining Runcorn Shopping City, encased in the original tiles

Construction began in 1968 by John Laing Group, commissioned by Grosvenor Estate Commercial Developments Limited and the Runcorn Development Corporation. The build cost £10 million and was privately financed by Grosvenor. The centre was completed by 1971 and Runcorn Shopping City was officially opened by Queen Elizabeth II on 5 May 1972. Shopping City and all of its surrounding ancillary buildings were encased in brilliant white tiles which were chosen to be self-cleansing; their crisp whiteness contrasting with the hill to the north and the trees and dense planting which would come to surround it. On its opening, The Times commented that, 'Shopping City is possibly the nearest planners have come to the sort of building imagined by science fiction writers. In appearance, it resembles a supersonic mosque, with gleaming white bricks even on the dullest day'. It also noted the 'clarity of the design of shops, malls and public squares' and the 'spacious, beautifully lighted shops'. The interior was finished with white terrazzo floor tiles throughout and Sicilian marble lining the walls, columns and shop fronts. The shops are laid out along malls in an H formation, with the 'Town Square' in the centre. There is a second storey around the square which was intended for restaurants and bars. At the time of its opening, it was the largest enclosed shopping centre in Europe and quickly established itself as a premier shopping destination. By the early 1980s all the units were fully let and new town residents recall the four multi-storey car parks - 2,200 spaces - as being almost full in the early days.

=== Decline ===
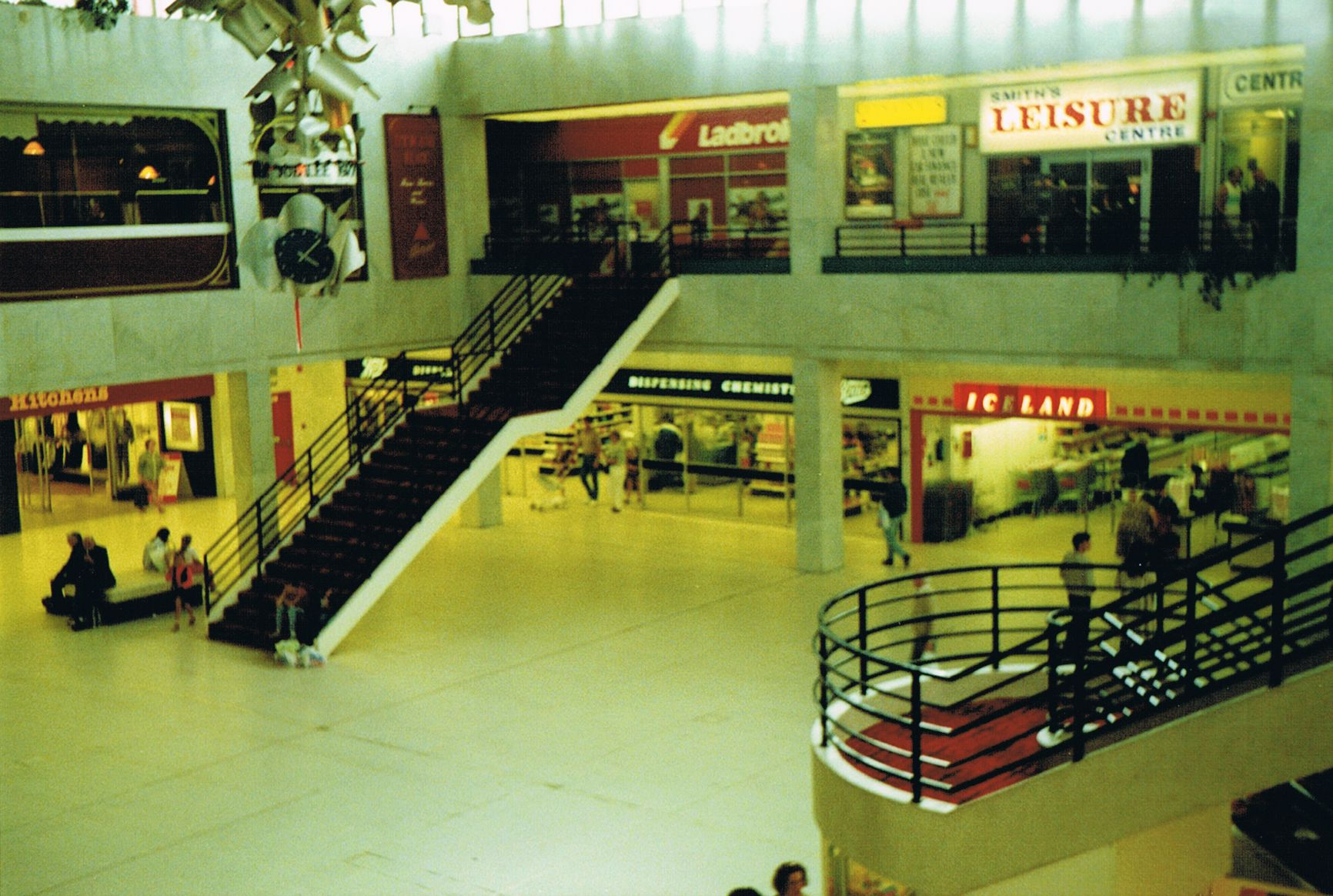
Town Square inside Runcorn Shopping City in August 1989

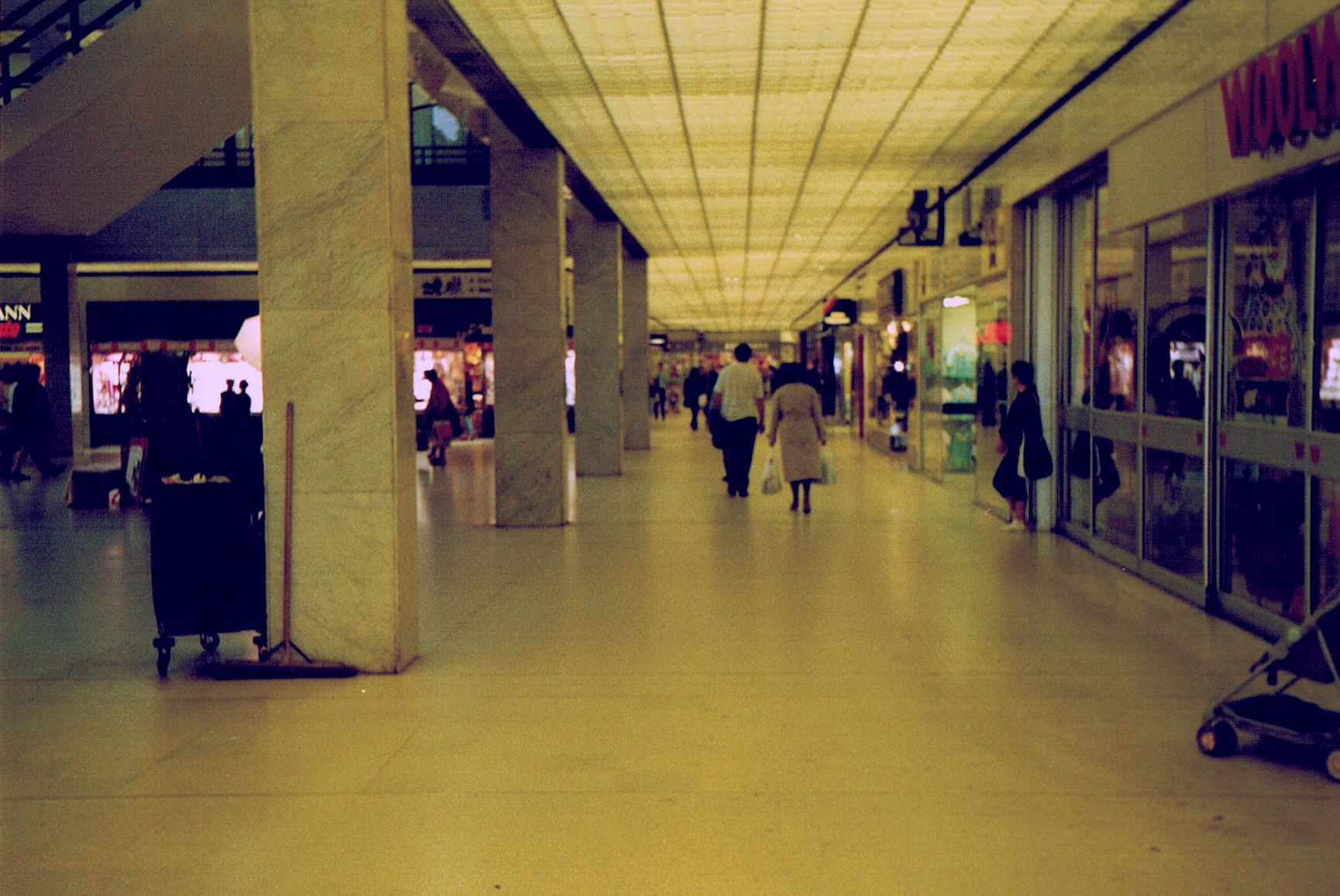
Mall inside Runcorn Shopping City in August 1989

The centre's early success at attracting huge numbers of shoppers, brought in by Runcorn's unique transportation system and its central location between Manchester and Liverpool, did not last as the owners at that time, Grosvenor, pushed rents up in an attempt to capitalise on the centre's popularity. Spiralling rents soon saw many of the big names close and move to centres with lower rents.

The centre was bought by Fordgate Midland Properties Limited in January 1989 but a dispute arose about the property's condition at the time of sale. The previous owners, Grosvenor, had contracted with Laing to encapsulate asbestos in the roof voids and decontaminate those areas in 1988. This became the source of legal disputes between the three parties since Fordgate alleged that Grosvenor had, in the words of Lord Justice Saville, "fraudulently or negligently misrepresented the true condition of the premises so that the Appellants were induced to purchase the premises, believing them to contain treated and encapsulated asbestos when, in fact, the roof voids were dreadfully...contaminated with loose asbestos fibre".

Fordgate undertook significant works to remove asbestos, replace and lower the original suspended ceiling, block up sky lights and replace damaged floor tiles and expansion joints, culminating with a rebranding in 1995 to Halton Lea Shopping Centre. In 1999, Fordgate used vacant land to the south of the centre, which had originally been intended for leisure and cultural use, to create a 217,393 sq ft (20,196.5 m^{2}) outdoor shopping park named Trident Retail Park, including a 9-screen cinema complex. In 1989, expansion land which had been set aside to the west of the centre was used to open a 90,000 sq ft (8,400 m^{2}) Asda superstore, later extended to 106,000 sq ft (9,800 m^{2}) and joined by a McDonald's restaurant.

Halton Lea was taken into receivership in September 2009 which was managed by Savills, though the centre continued to operate as normal. In September 2010, the centre was put up for sale and on 24 March 2011 it was announced that the centre had been sold to F&C Reit (since rebranded BMO Real Estate Partners) for approximately £29.1 million using an offshore company, Runcorn One Ltd, registered in Guernsey.

However, Fordgate retained ownership of one of the four multi-storey car parks, and in August 2011, planning permission was granted to build a 148,348 square feet (13,782.0 m^{2}) superstore adjoining the shopping centre in place of the multi-storey car park, East Lane House and a Territorial Army Centre. Fordgate had said they would pay for a replacement TA Centre elsewhere in the town and the plan was approved by Halton Borough Council, despite objections from the new owners of the Shopping City. The scheme did not go ahead and by November 2014 the fourth car park was also under the ownership of BMO. Trident Retail Park was also sold separately from the enclosed shopping centre and in April 2014 was acquired by KWE.

=== Refurbishment ===
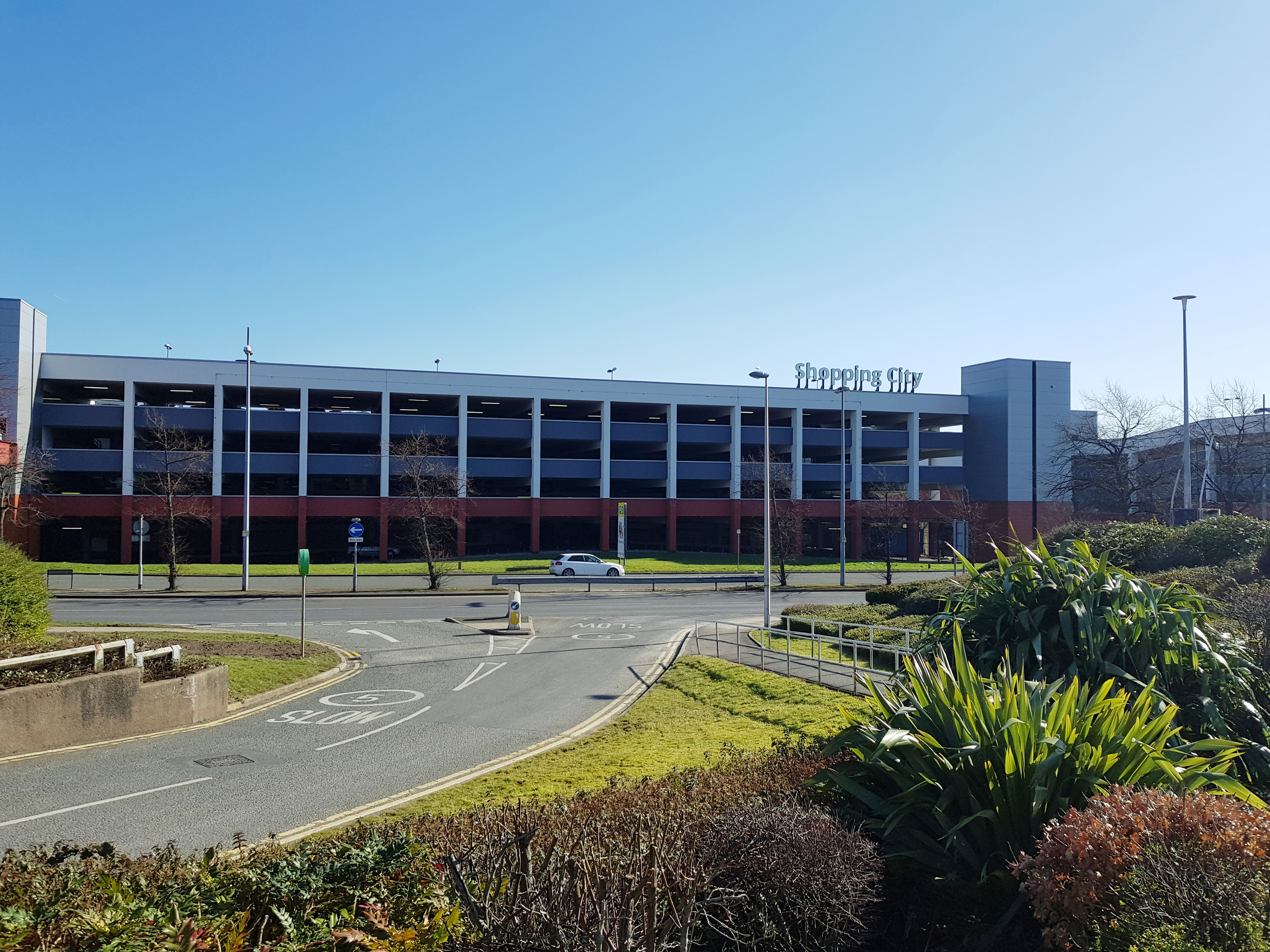
Exterior of one of the four multi-storey car parks at Runcorn Shopping City after renovation

In summer 2012, plans were announced for the renovation of the exterior of the building and three of the four multi-storey car parks to the designs of architects Leach Rhodes Walker of Manchester. The total sum invested by BMO exceeded £3 million. The exterior had not been modified significantly since construction in the 1970s, and in 2010, a net was fitted around the building to stop detaching tiles from falling. In October 2013, following the renovation, the centre was re-branded to Runcorn Shopping Centre. Also in 2013, the surrounding area saw new investment by developer Opus Land North with the construction of a new Lidl, Burger King, garages and a car dealership on the site of the former Vestric House.

Directory map of Runcorn Shopping City

A setback occurred in April 2015 when Tesco, one of the centre's anchor tenants, announced it was closing several stores across the UK, including its Runcorn store. Tesco had operated a large supermarket in the shopping centre since the 1970s. The floor-space had been reduced in the early 2000s and the store rebranded as a Tesco Metro. The former Tesco unit was then occupied by The Range from 2015 to 2021.

Despite its many name changes, most Runcorn residents continued to call it by its original name of Runcorn Shopping City; it reverted to its original name for its 45th birthday in July 2017. Its new logo, inspired by original signage, was created by John Saunders.

In August 2017, as part of a demerger, the centre was transferred to Capreon before entering administration in 2019. In April 2018, Halton Borough Council unveiled concept plans for the regeneration of the area surrounding and adjoining the Shopping City under the theme, 'Halton Healthy New Town'. The centrepiece of this plan had been the reconstruction of the neighbouring Halton General Hospital site but funding from central government programmes was denied and the wider regeneration plans stalled. Following the centre entering receivership in 2019, Savills appointed RivingtonHark to work with Halton Borough Council and asset management company ICG Longbow to develop the site into a 'mixed use retail, lifestyle and wellness centre.'

== See also ==
- List of shopping centres in the United Kingdom
