= Runcorn Busway =

Busway system in Runcorn, England

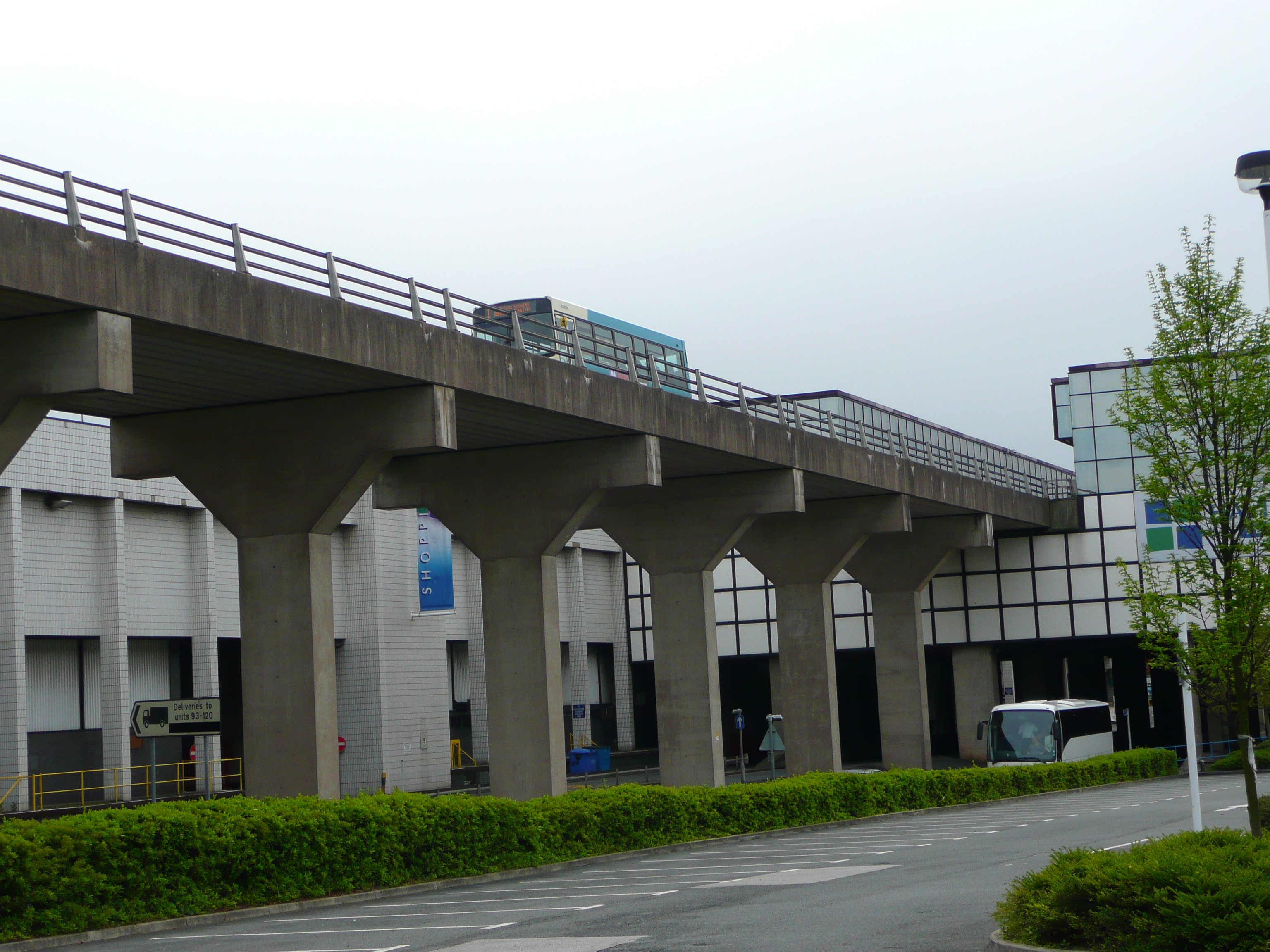
- An elevated section of the Busway at Runcorn Shopping City in 2008

Overview
- Owner: Halton Borough Council
- Area served: Runcorn
- Transit type: Bus rapid transit

Operation
- Began operation: October 1971; 55 years ago

Technical
- System length: 22 km (14 mi)

The Runcorn Busway is a bus rapid transit (BRT) system in Runcorn, England. Opened in 1971, it was the first BRT system in the world.

== History ==
First conceived in the Runcorn New Town Masterplan in 1966, it opened for services in October 1971 and all 22 kilometres (14 mi) were operational by 1980. It was the first BRT system in the world. Arthur Ling, Runcorn Development Corporation's master planner, said that he had invented the concept while sketching on the back of an envelope. The masterplan considered a variety of transport systems, including a monorail, but a busway was judged to be more economical. The town was designed around the transport system, with most residents no more than five minutes' walking distance, or 500 yards (460 m), from the busway.

The busway was designed to cross the town in a figure of 8. It was created exclusively for buses, excluding both pedestrians and private vehicles, and where the route crossed general roads and didn't go over a bridge or underneath, buses were given priority at the traffic lights. The central station is at Runcorn Shopping City where buses arrive on dedicated raised busways to two enclosed stations.

Initially, the bus operator on the busway was Crosville. The National Bus Company commissioned an electrical conversion of a Leyland National in the 1970s by removing the diesel engine and adding a 7 tonne battery trailer. The length of the vehicle meant that it needed special permission to operate on the highway, and this was only granted on the Runcorn Busway where it operated sporadically, with its range of 60 to 80 miles on an 8 hour charge too short for use all day.

== Technical details ==
The Busway has a design speed of 40 mph (64 km/h) and a maximum gradient of 4 per cent (or 6 per cent for distances under 200 m (660 ft)). Bus stops are at intervals of approximately 400 m (1,300 ft).

== Gallery ==
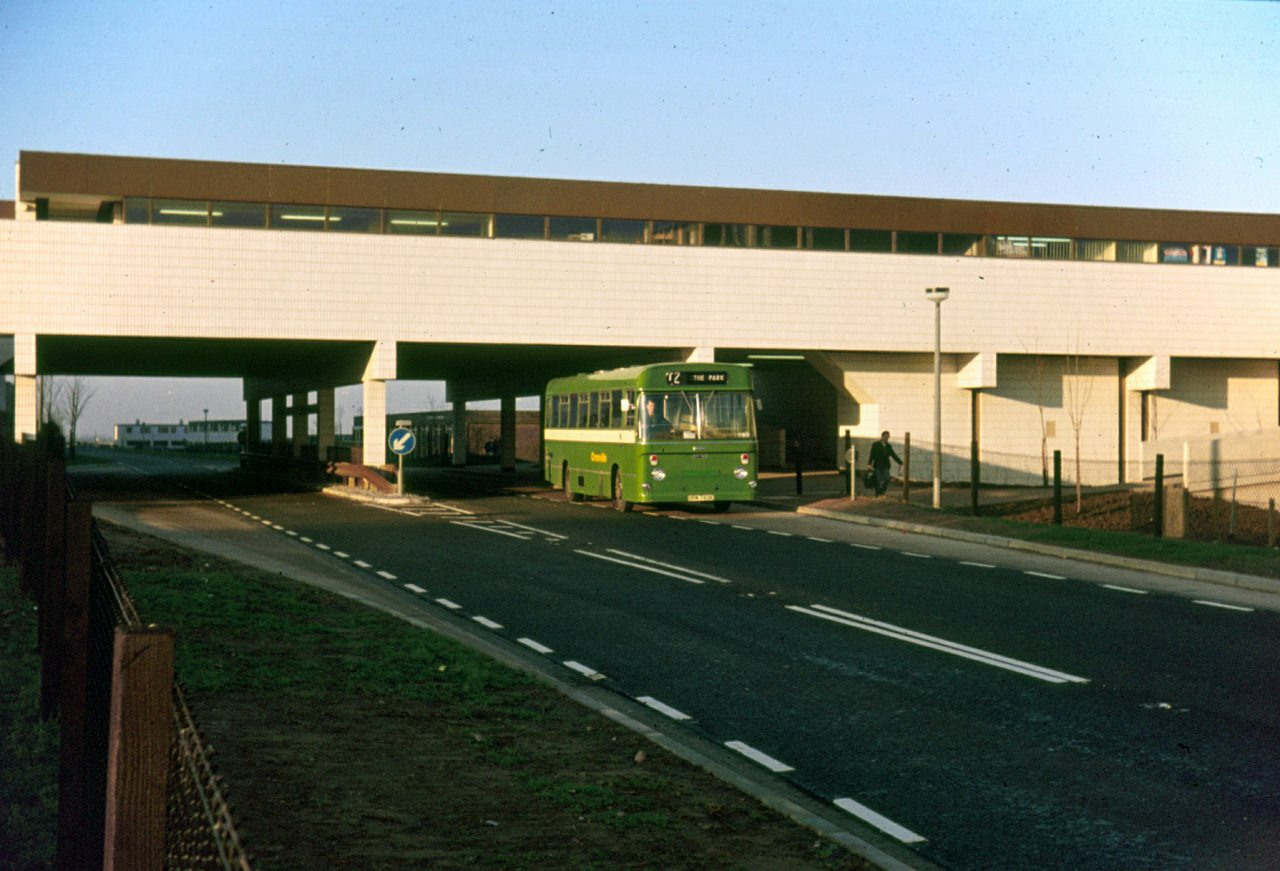
The Busway integrated with Castlefields local centre in 1971, now demolished

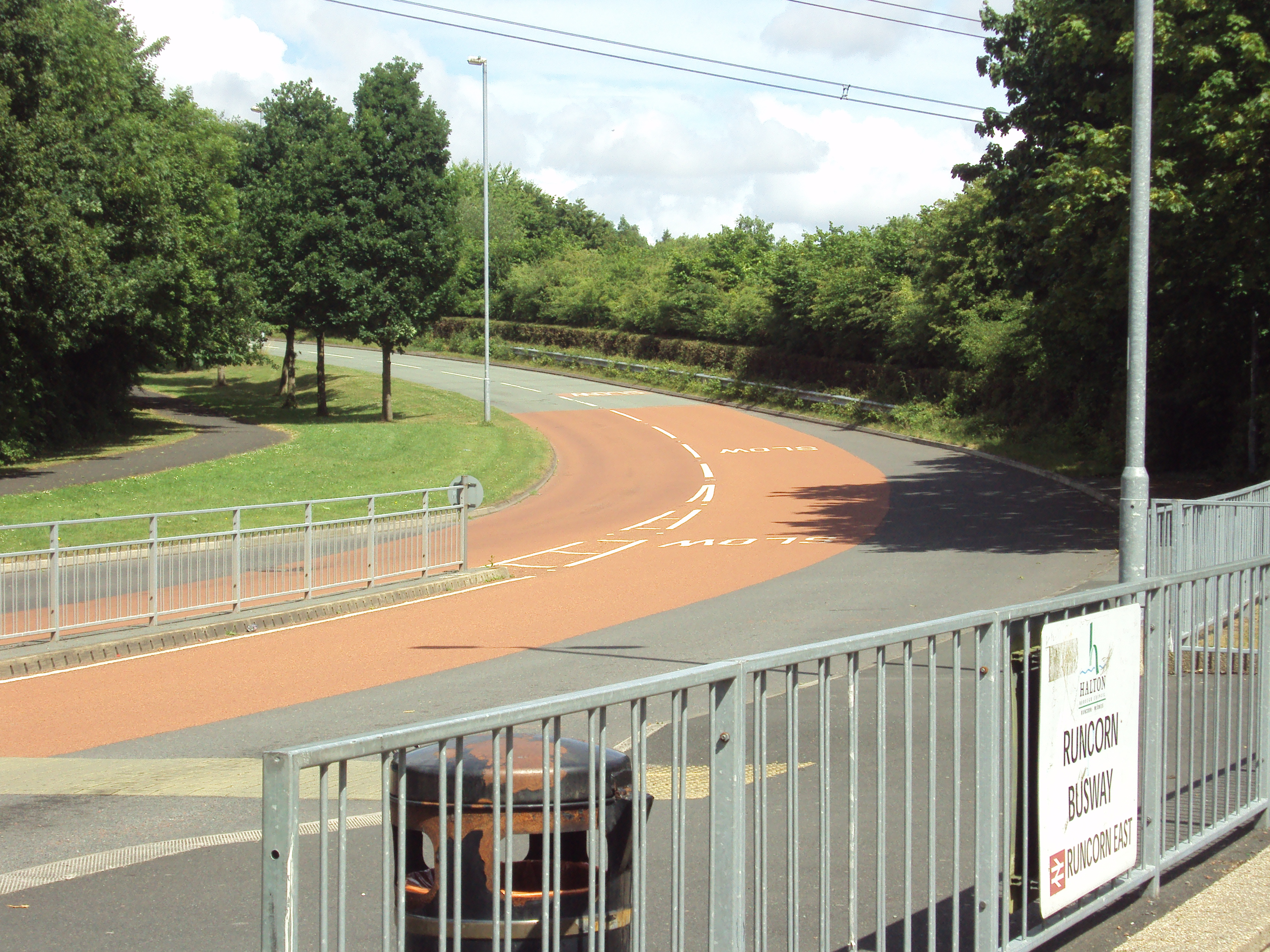
The Busway station for Runcorn East railway station

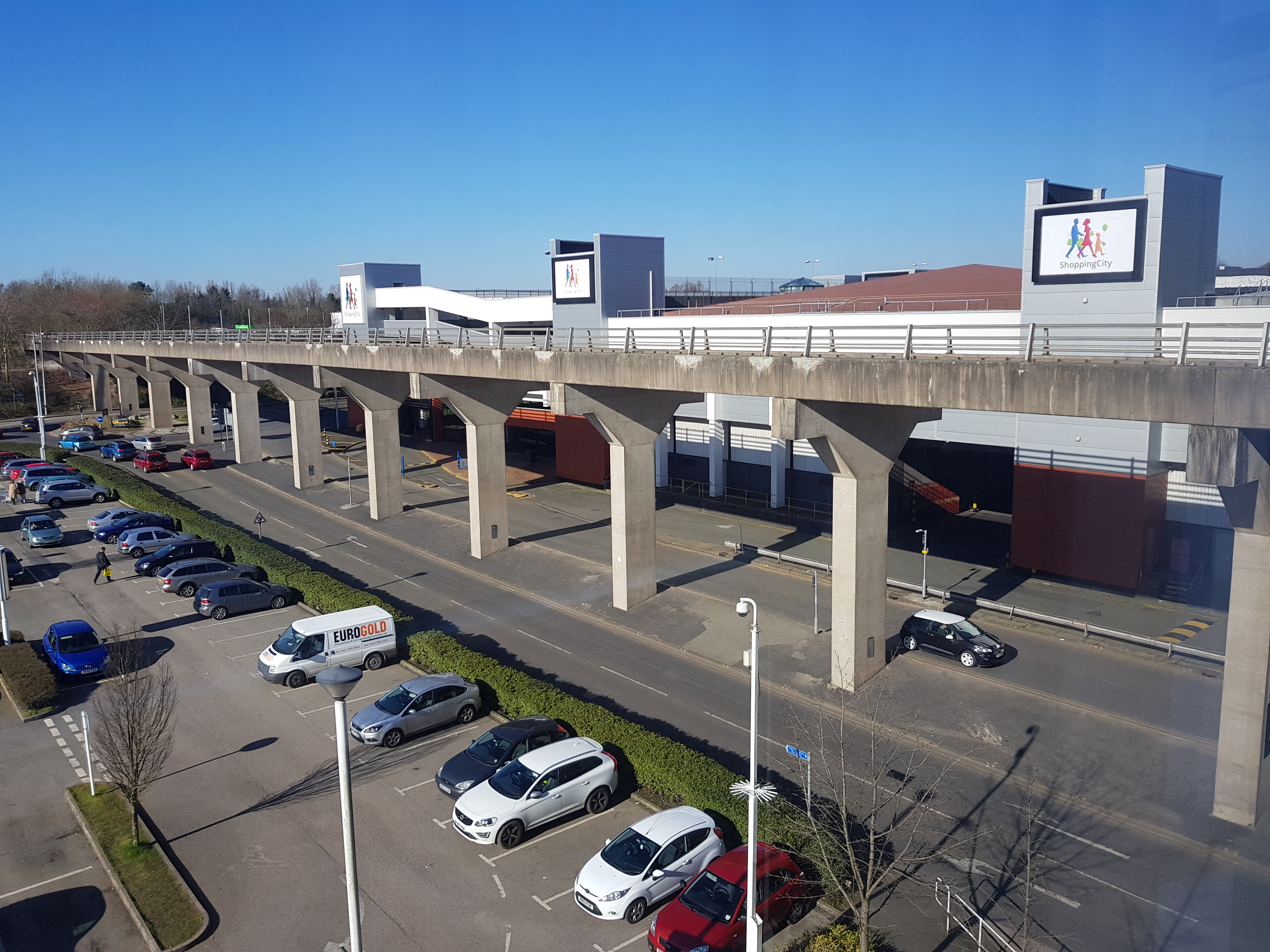
Elevated section of the Busway at Runcorn Shopping City

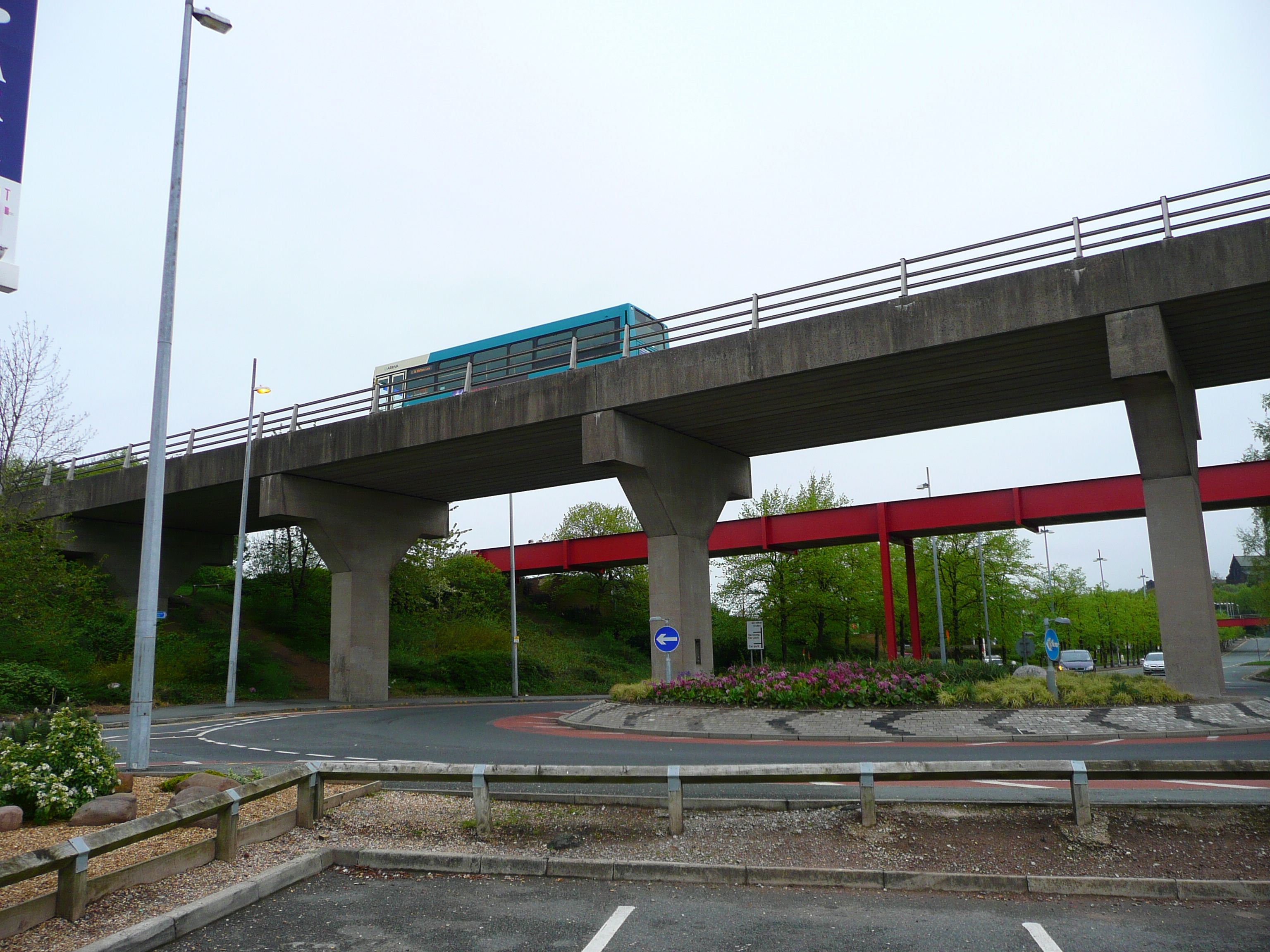
Elevated section of the Busway at Runcorn Shopping City passing over a roundabout

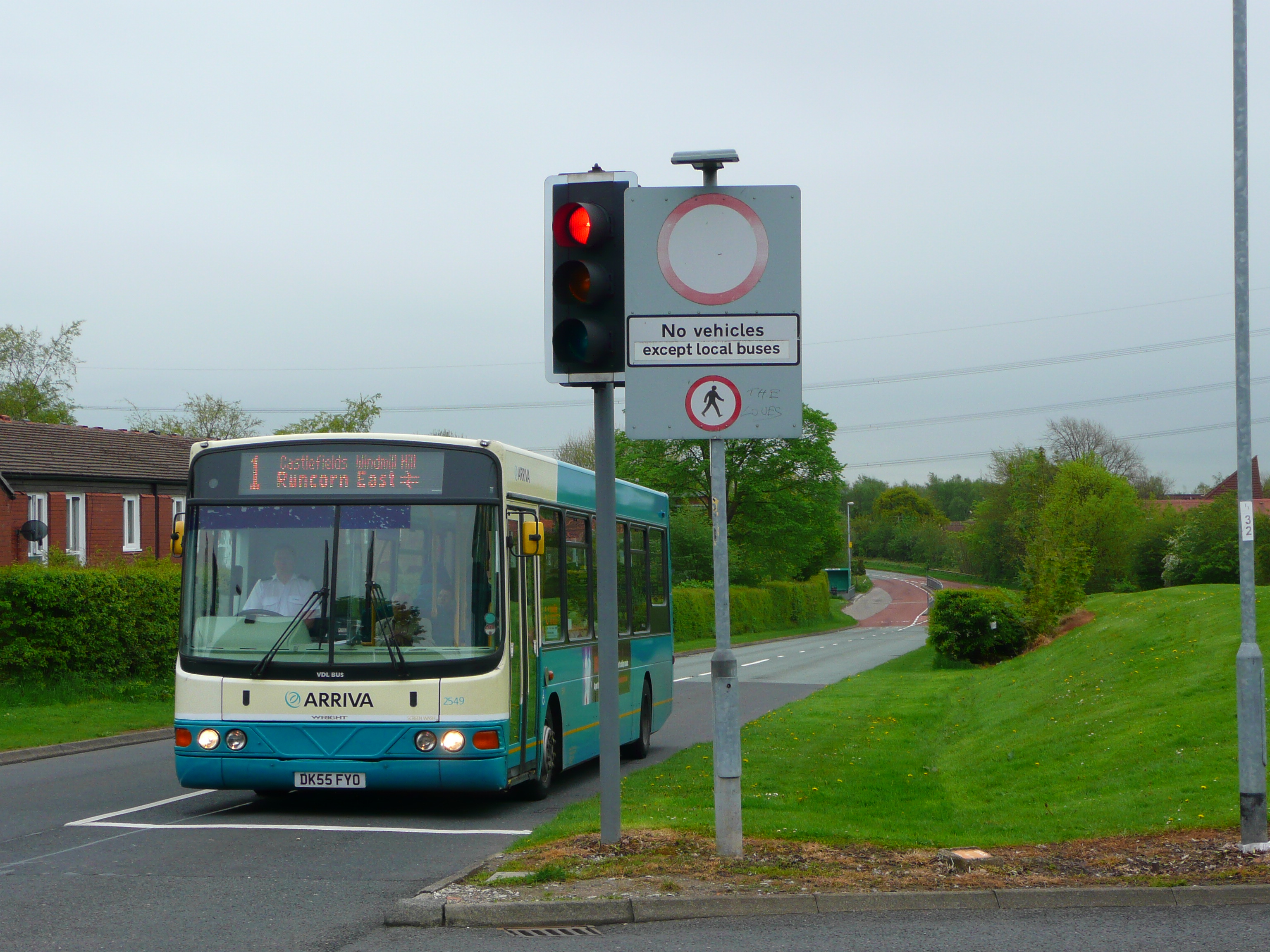
A Busway junction with a general traffic road

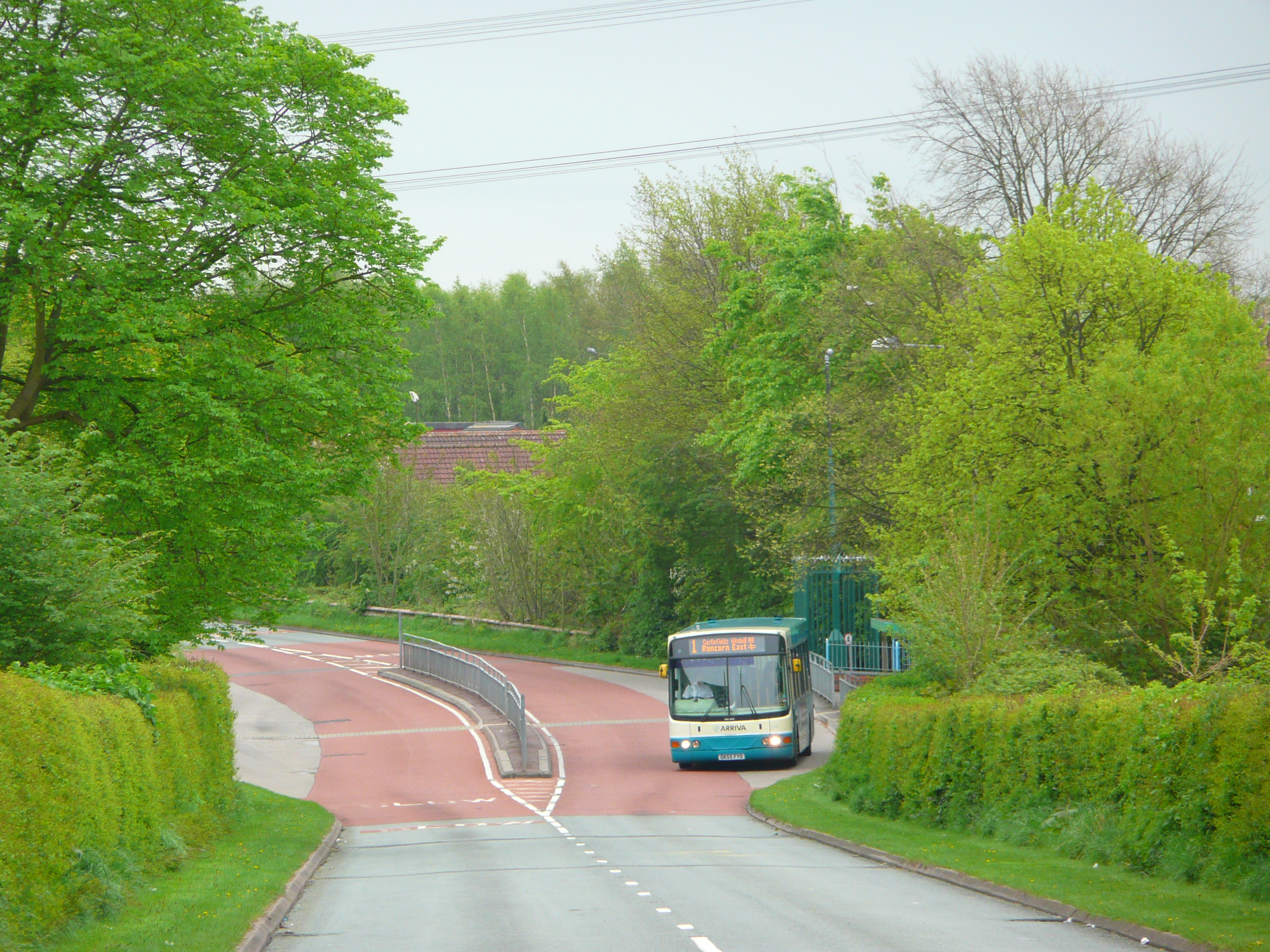
An Arriva bus in east Runcorn
