= Coventry Central Baths =

Coventry Central Baths, Coventry
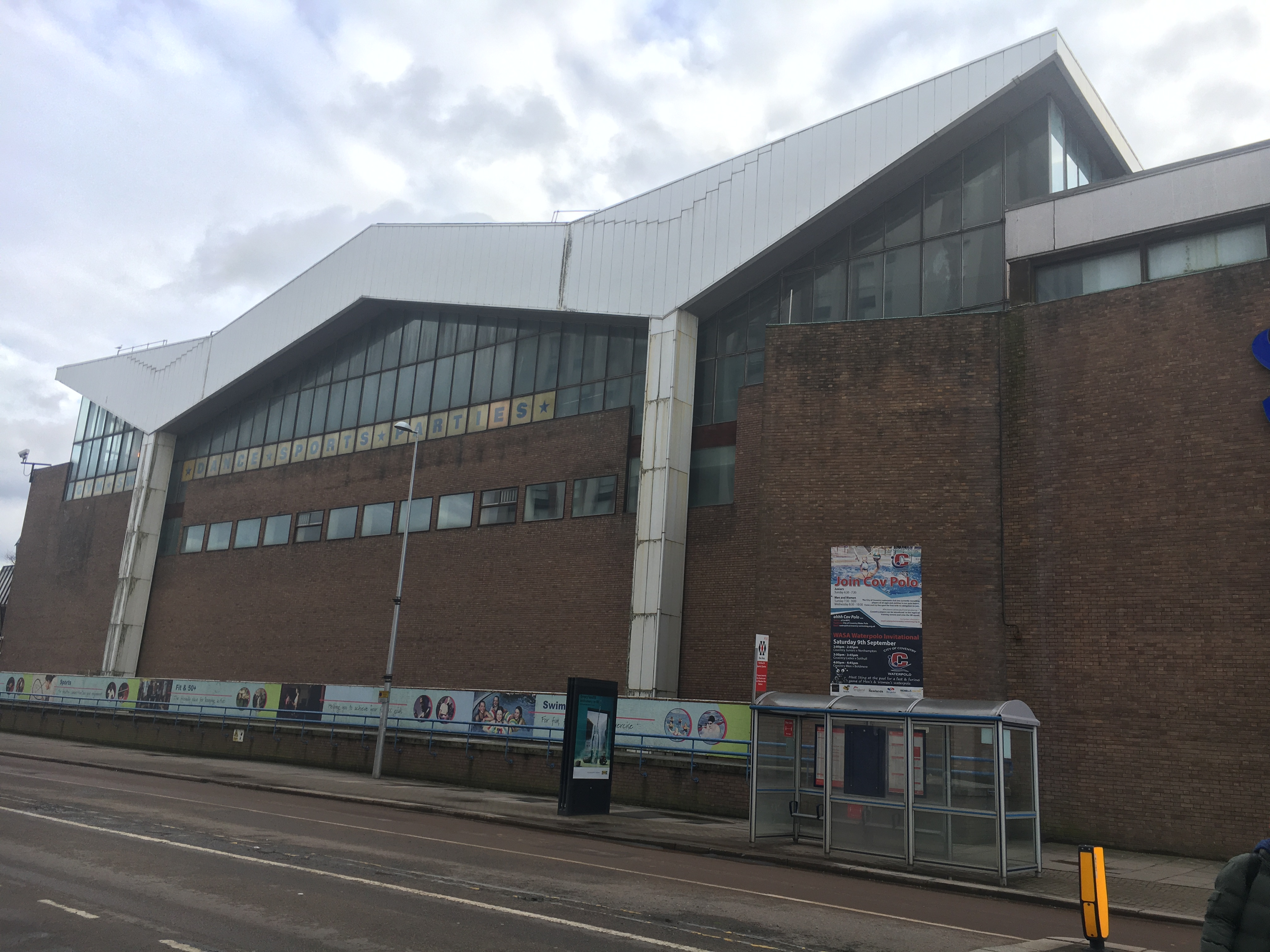
- The north elevation of Coventry Central Baths, showing the unusual winged roofline
- Interactive map of the Coventry Central Baths, Coventry area
- Alternative names: Coventry Sports & Leisure Centre

General information
- Type: Leisure centre
- Architectural style: Modernist
- Location: Fairfax Street, Coventry, England
- Coordinates: 52.4091°N 1.50452°W
- Construction started: 1962
- Completed: 1966
- Opened: 23 April 1966
- Closed: 15 February 2020
- Owner: Coventry City Council

Technical details
- Structural system: Steel frame, brick cladding

Design and construction
- Architects: Coventry City Architect's Department (Arthur Ling, Terence Gregory), Michael McLellan principal architect, Paul Beney assistant in charge
- Designations: Grade II Listed

Website
- http://coventrysports.co.uk/centres/coventry-sports-and-leisure-centre

Coventry Central Baths was a leisure centre in Coventry, England. It is located on Fairfax Street in the city centre, and was the main building of the Coventry Sports & Leisure Centre until its closure in February 2020.

== History ==
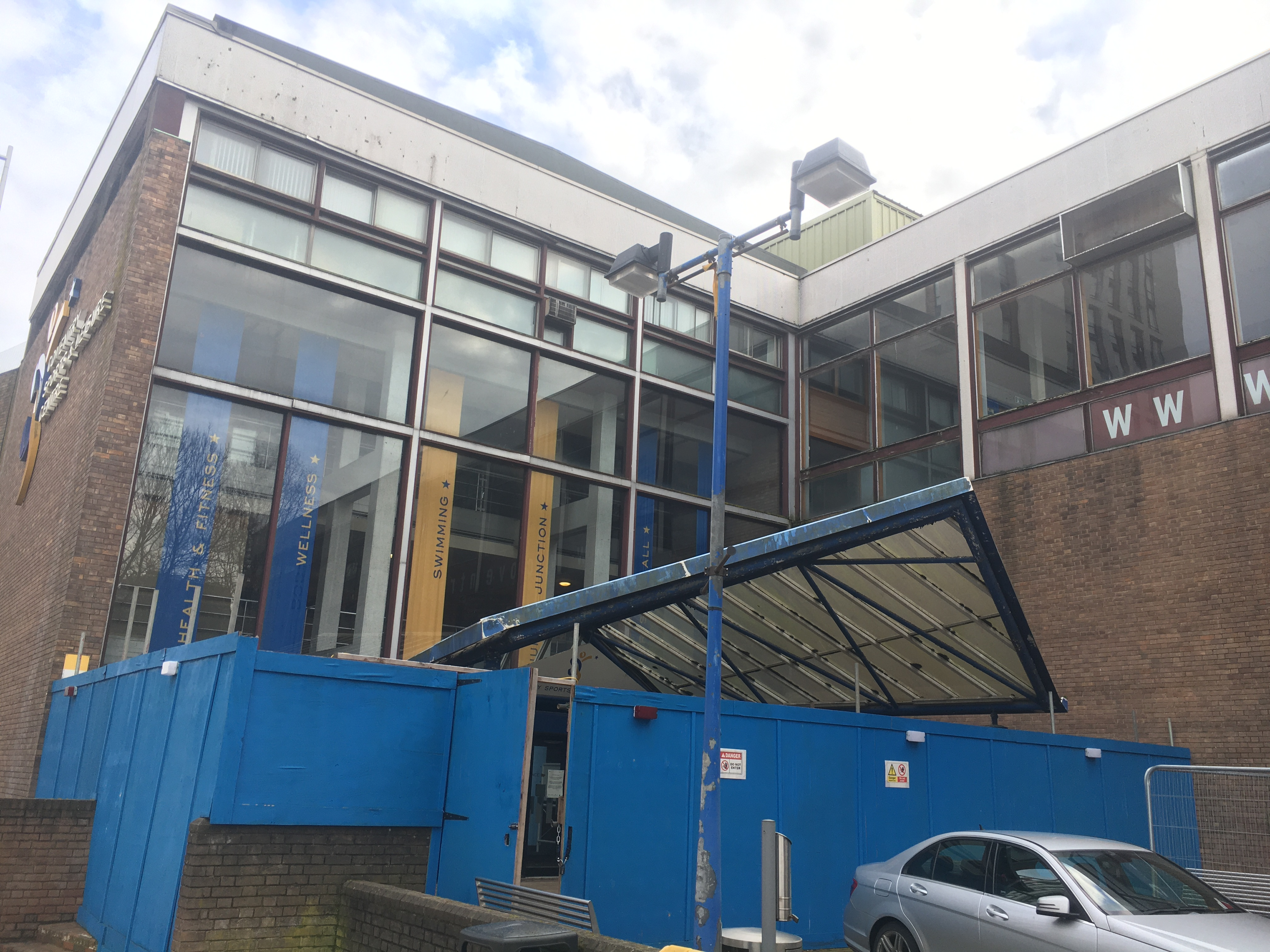
The shuttered rear entrance of the baths in February 2020

Bombing in the Second World War destroyed four out of five of Coventry's swimming baths, leading to the council's decision in 1956 to build a large central complex to meet the city's needs. The building was designed by Michael McLellan of the Coventry City Architect's Department under Arthur Ling and Terence Gregory, who were also responsible for the Belgrade Theatre. Construction started in 1962, finishing in 1966. The foundation stone was ceremonially laid by Alderman A.J. Waugh on 9 April 1963. The baths were opened by Edwin Moody Rogers (Lord Mayor of Coventry) on 23 April 1966, who described them as the finest baths in Europe. The complex was extended in 1976 with the completion of the Elephant, a dry sports centre straddling Cox Street to the east Central Baths. A glass walled covered walkway connects the two buildings. The Central Baths building (but not the Elephant) was Grade II listed in 1997.

In August 2014 the council announced that they planned to close the Central Baths, which at the time contained the region's only Olympic-sized swimming pool. The final swimming session took place on 15 February 2020. The future of the building was unclear, as the council had not announced plans for its redevelopment. The Central Baths are viewed as a "Building at Risk" by the Coventry Society.

In August 2025 the BBC reported that Historic England will not stand in the way of the building being demolished and that Coventry City Council plans to bring forward demolition plans before the end of the year.

== Design ==
The Central Baths contained three swimming pools, including a 165-foot main pool, later shortened to the Olympic regulation 50 metres. Designed in the style of the Modern Movement, the building was viewed as an architectural success at the time, the Architects' Journal of May 25, 1966, stating that "its best features are the main pool hall with its W-shaped roof and seven pitched lights over the three storey high glass wall overlooking the sunbathing terraces and gardens".

== See also ==
- Coventry Cathedral
- Houses for Visiting Mathematicians
