= The Elephant Building =

The Elephant, Coventry
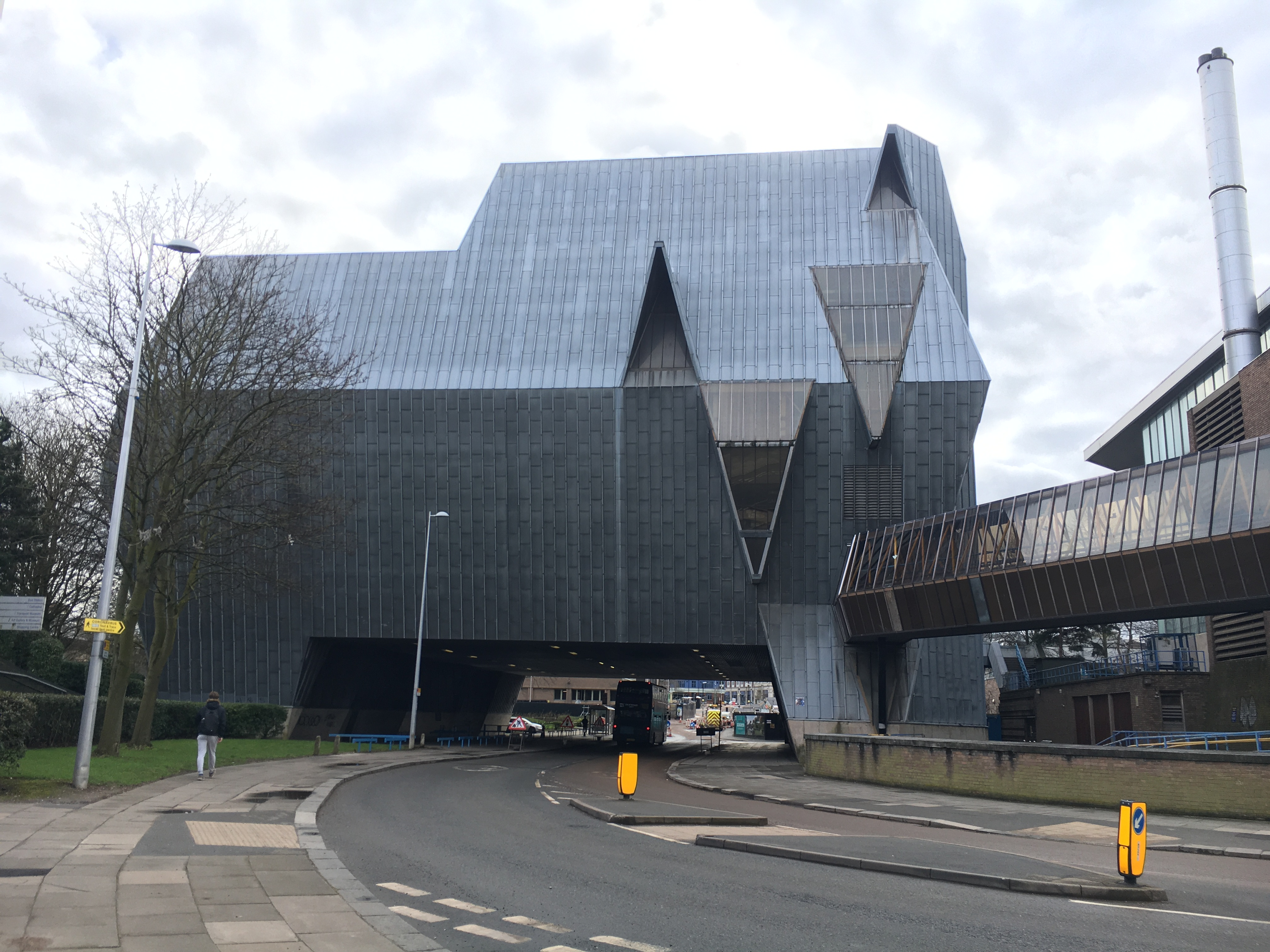
- The Elephant viewed from the corner of Cox Street and Fairfax Street
- Interactive map of the The Elephant, Coventry area
- Alternative names: The Elephant Building

General information
- Type: Leisure centre
- Architectural style: Brutalist
- Location: Cox Street, Coventry, England
- Coordinates: 52.40878°N 1.50338°W
- Construction started: 1974
- Completed: 1976
- Owner: Coventry City Council

Design and construction
- Architects: Terence Gregory, Harry Noble

The Elephant Building is part of a leisure complex in Coventry city centre, England. It was intended to extend the pre-existing Coventry Central Baths building, to which it is connected with an enclosed walkway (the "elephant's trunk").

== History ==
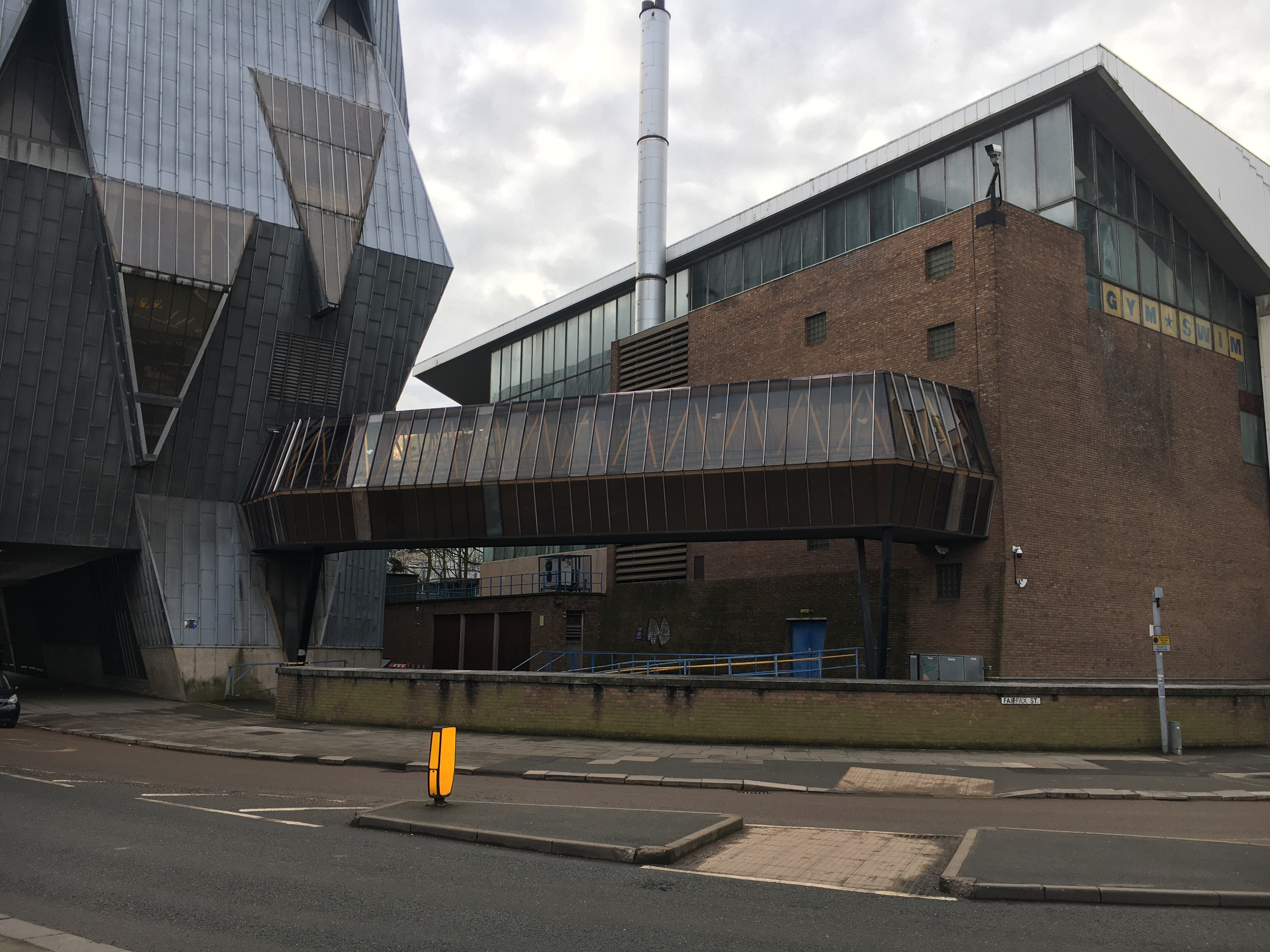
The "Elephant's trunk" connecting the Elephant to the rest of the leisure centre

The main building of the leisure complex was opened in 1966, providing Coventry with the region's only Olympic-size swimming pool with seating for spectators, making it a focal point for swimming in the West Midlands. A ring road around Coventry was completed in 1972, leaving a small area of land either side of Cox Street at the end of the Coventry Baths building. The city architect's department designed a building to straddle the road, and construction started on the zinc-coated Elephant building in 1974. After construction finished in 1976, the building was opened in 1977. It was used as part of Coventry Sports & Leisure Centre until it was closed by Coventry City Council in February 2020. The main building was Grade II listed in 1997, but the Elephant itself is not listed.

== Design ==
The building is designed to look like an elephant in reference to the coat of arms of the city of Coventry, which shows Coventry Castle being carried on the back of an elephant. Elephants are a popular motif in the civic life of Coventry, appearing on the logo of Coventry City F.C. and Coventry R.F.C. as well as the badge of HMS Coventry.

== Future ==
The future of the Elephant building is uncertain after the closure of the leisure centre in 2020. Coventry City Council is yet to announce firm plans for the building's redevelopment, but it may become a community art space. Proposals to transform it into a nightclub were not progressed.

On May 15, 2021, as part of the launch for Coventry being UK City of Culture 2021, the words of local author George Eliot "It is always fatal to have music or poetry interrupted" were projected onto the building.
