= Arthur Ling =

British architect and town planner (1913–95)

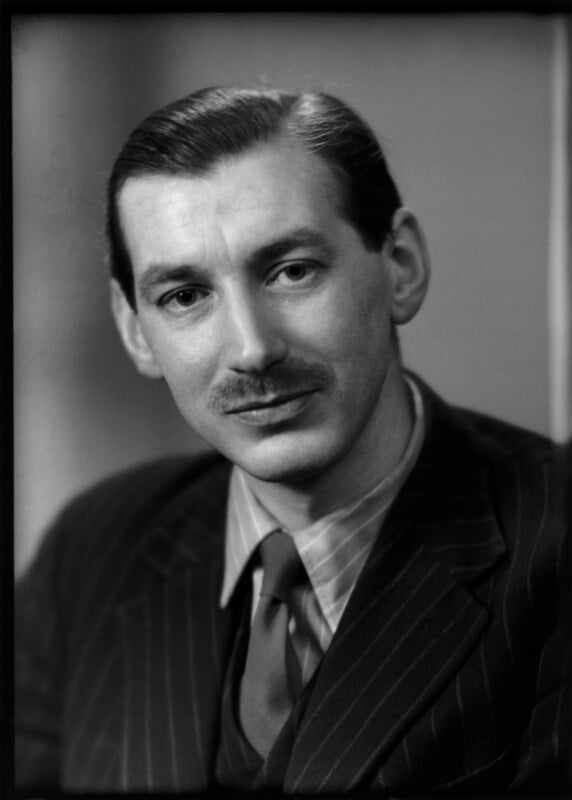
- Ling in 1948
- Born: Arthur George Ling; 20 September 1913; Swindon, Wiltshire, England
- Died: 20 December 1995 (aged 82); Helmdon, Brackley, Northamptonshire
- Education: Bartlett School of Architecture, University College London
- Occupation: Architect
- Spouse: Marjorie Tall
- Children: 4
- Practice: Arthur Ling and Associates
- Buildings: Belgrade Theatre, Coventry Central Baths
- Projects: Lansbury Estate, Runcorn New Town

Arthur George Ling (20 September 1913 – 20 December 1995) was a British architect and town planner. From 1955 to 1964, he was City Architect and Planning Officer for Coventry. As head of Nottingham University’s Department of Architecture, he was Consultant Architect-Planner for the Runcorn New Town Masterplan (1967). There he invented the Runcorn Busway, the world's first bus rapid transit system.

== Early life and education ==
Ling was born in Swindon, Wiltshire on 20 September 1913. He was educated at Christ's Hospital, Horsham before winning a scholarship to study at the Bartlett School of Architecture, University College London. After graduating a BA (Architecture), he was awarded a Diploma in Town Planning in 1938.

== Career ==
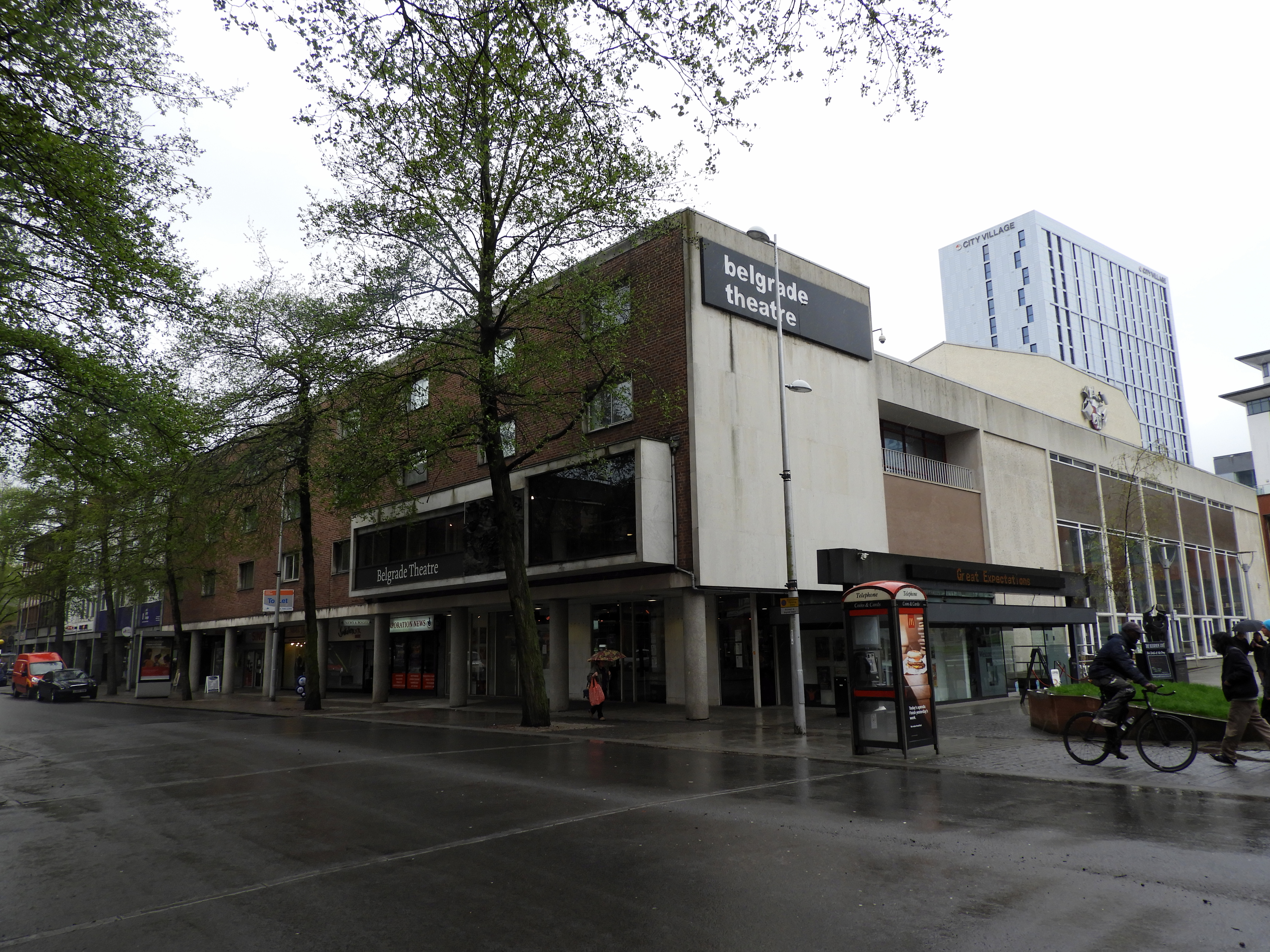
The Belgrade Theatre in Coventry, designed by Arthur Ling

Ling began his career as a planner at London County Council in 1936 before joining the modernist practice of Maxwell Fry and Walter Gropius in 1937. At the beginning of the Second World War, he became structural engineer at the City of London Corporation before returning to the county council in 1941 where he helped to prepare the County of London Plan.

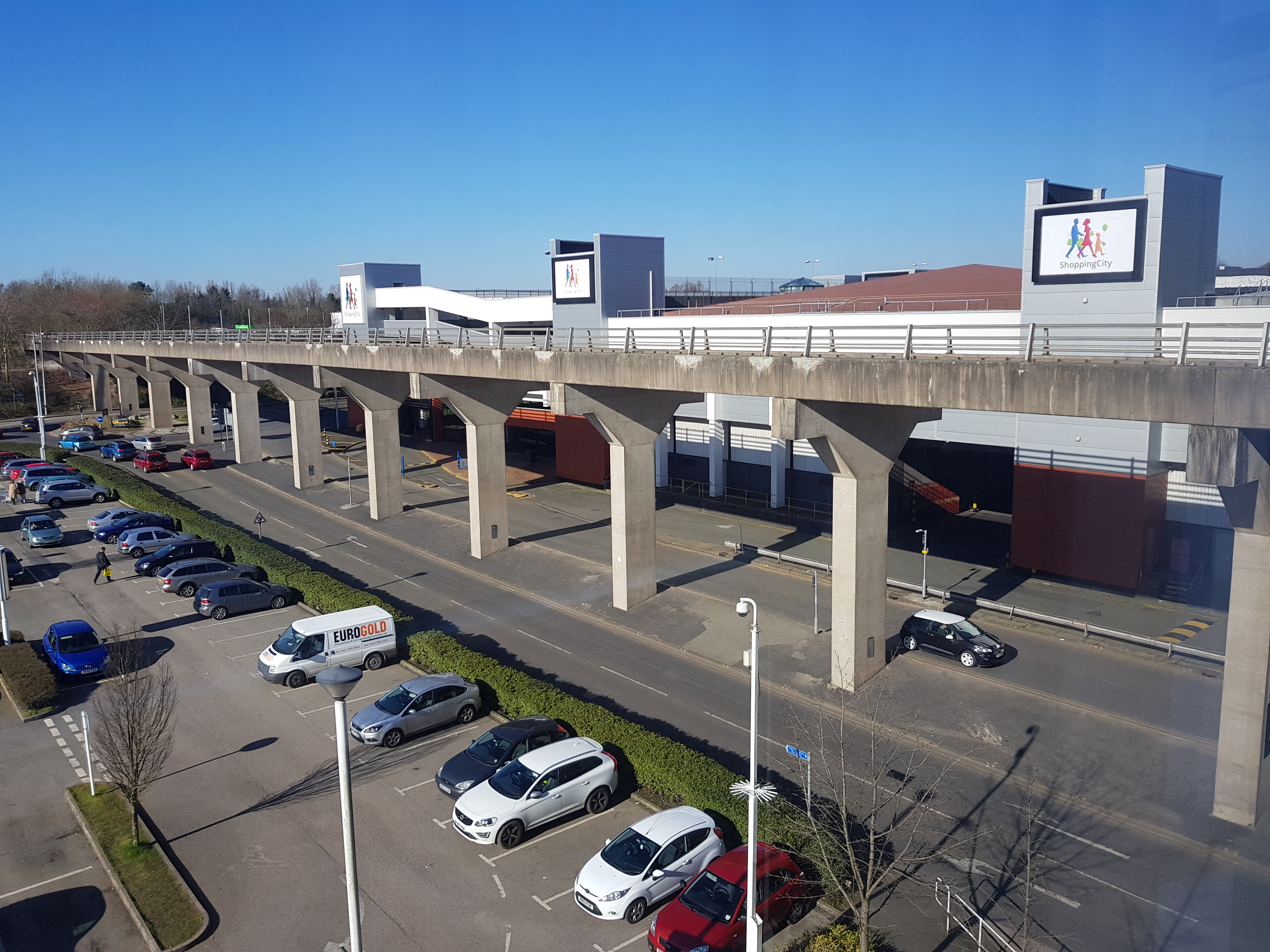
Elevated busway at Runcorn Shopping City

In 1955, he became City Architect and Planning Officer for Coventry. Following several part-time positions at the Hammersmith School of Art and UCL, Ling was appointed Professor and Head of Nottingham University’s Department of Architecture in 1964. In that capacity, he created the Runcorn new town masterplan and the world's first bus rapid transit system, the Runcorn Busway, while sketching on the back of an envelope.

== Political views ==
Ling joined the Communist Party as a student, and following a visit in 1939, stayed on in the USSR to study Soviet town planning. He was active in the Society for Cultural Relations with the USSR after the Second World War and was a founder member of the Society for Anglo-Chinese Understanding in 1965.

== Personal life and death ==
He married Marjorie Tall on 22 April 1939 with whom he had one son and three daughters. He died on 20 December 1995 at his home in Helmdon, Brackley, Northamptonshire.

== Recognition and media ==
Ling was made Vice President of the Royal Institute of British Architects from 1963 to 1964, and Honorary Treasurer from 1964 to 1967. He was President of the Town Planning Institute from 1968 to 1969.

Ling featured in two films on planning: Proud City (1946) on the 1943 County of London Plan, and Basingstoke - Runcorn: British New Towns (1974), a Canadian information film.
