= List of bus rapid transit systems in India =

Map of cities in India with urban transit systems such as rapid transit, suburban rail, monorail, bus rapid transit and tram

Operational, under construction, and planned bus rapid transit systems in India include the following.

== Operational ==
System	City	State	Opened	Length	Lines	Stations
Indore Bus Rapid Transit System	Indore	Madhya Pradesh	2013	126.46	10	N/A
Ahmedabad Bus Rapid Transit System	Ahmedabad	Gujarat	14 October 2009	118	18	139
Surat Bus Rapid Transit System	Surat	Gujarat	26 January 2013	114	15	148
Hubli-Dharwad Bus Rapid Transit System	Hubli, Dharwad	Karnataka	2 October 2018	70	2	33
Amritsar Metrobus	Amritsar	Punjab	15 December 2016	68	7	136
Rajkot Bus Rapid Transit System	Rajkot	Gujarat	1 October 2012	10.5	1	19
Rainbow Bus Rapid Transit System	Pune and Pimpri-Chinchwad	Maharashtra	December 2006	61	6	102
Raipur and Naya Raipur Bus Rapid Transit System	Raipur and New Raipur	Chhattisgarh	1 November 2016	60	2	10
Visakhapatnam Bus Rapid Transit System	Vishakhapatnam	Andhra Pradesh	2 October 2016	42	2	
Vijayawada Bus Rapid Transit System	Vijayawada	Andhra Pradesh	2011	40	2	58
Jaipur Bus Rapid Transit System	Jaipur	Rajasthan	July 2010		2	

== Proposed ==
Approved Proposed

System	City	State / union territory	Length	Lines	Stations	Ref.
Mumbai Bus Rapid Transit System	Mumbai	Maharashtra	11.7 km (7.3 mi)	1		
Bhubaneswar Bus Rapid Transit System	Bhubaneswar	Odisha	66.32 km (41.21 mi)	1		
Chennai Bus Rapid Transit System	Chennai	Tamil Nadu	70.3 km (43.7 mi)	1	21	
Coimbatore Bus Rapid Transit System	Coimbatore	Tamil Nadu	27.6 km (17.1 mi)	1		
Hyderabad Bus Rapid Transit System	Hyderabad	Telangana	39 km (24 mi)	2		
Madurai Bus Rapid Transit System	Madurai	Tamil Nadu		2		
Tiruchirappalli Bus Rapid Transit System	Tiruchirappalli	Tamil Nadu	112 km (70 mi)	4		
Guwahati Bus Rapid Transit System	Guwahati	Assam				

== Defunct ==
System	Locale	State / union territory	Opened	Closed	Length	Lines	Stations	Notes
Delhi Bus Rapid Transit System	New Delhi	Delhi	20 April 2008	9 November 2017	115.5 km (71.8 mi)	7		
Jodhpur Bus Rapid Transit System	Jodhpur	Rajasthan	15 January 2016	January 2021	160.6 km (99.8 mi)	6		Suspended
Bhopal Bus Rapid Transit System	Bhopal	Madhya Pradesh	2006	23 December 2023	186 km (116 mi)	10	230	Dismantled citing 'traffic problems'

== Proposed bus rapid transit using trolleybuses ==
Approved
Proposed

System	Locale	State / union territory	Lines	Stations	Length	Planned opening
Greater Nashik Metro	Nashik	Maharashtra	2	30	32 km (20 mi)	2029
Pune Metro Neo	Pune	Maharashtra	1	45	43.84 km (27.24 mi)	2028–29
Mysuru Metro Neo	Mysuru	Karnataka	1	TBD	TBD	TBD
Ranchi Metro	Ranchi	Jharkhand	TBD	TBD	TBD	TBD
Warangal Metro	Warangal	Telangana	TBD	TBD	TBD	TBD
Kolkata Trolleybus	Kolkata	West Bengal	Various	TBD	TBD	TBD
Uttarakhand Metro	Dehradun, Haridwar, Rishikesh	Uttarakhand	2	25	22.42 km (13.93 mi)	TBD

== Gallery ==
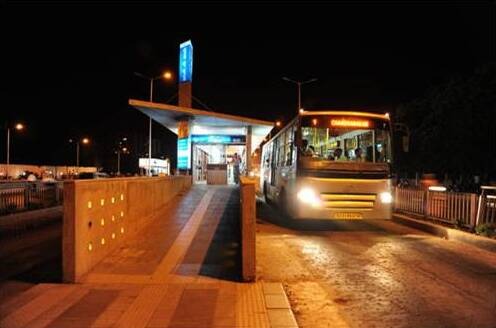
Bus arriving at a station in the Ahmedabad Bus Rapid Transit System

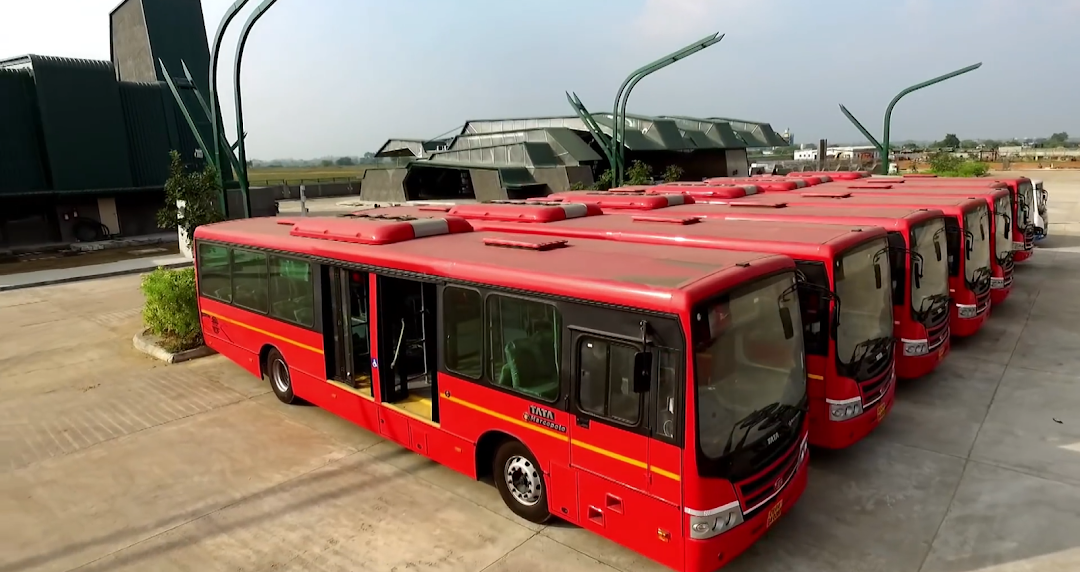
Raipur and Naya Raipur Bus Rapid Transit System

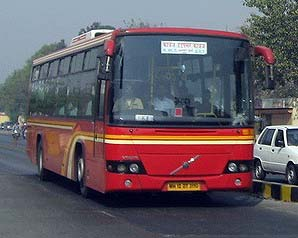
A bus of the Rainbow Bus Rapid Transit System in Pune

== See also ==
- Transport in India
- Bus rapid transit
- List of bus rapid transit systems
- Urban rail transit in India
