= Public Works Department (India) =

Government department in India

The Public Works Department (PWD) in India is a governmental organization responsible for the construction, maintenance, and management of public infrastructure, including roads, bridges, buildings, and water systems. It is one of the oldest and most significant institutions in India, originally established during the British Raj period and later reorganized post-independence.

== History ==
The PWD's origins date back to 1854 when it was formalized under British rule. Initially focused on road construction and irrigation works, the department played a crucial role in developing India's early infrastructure. After India's independence in 1947, the PWD was reorganized and decentralized, with each state forming its own PWD to cater to regional infrastructure needs.

=== Organizational Structure ===
PWD operates at both the central and state levels:

- Central Public Works Department (CPWD): Functions under the Ministry of Housing and Urban Affairs, handling federal infrastructure projects such as government buildings, national highways, and major public works.
- State Public Works Departments: Each state has its own PWD responsible for infrastructure within its jurisdiction. These state-level PWDs report to their respective state governments.

The department is organized hierarchically, with positions such as chief engineer, superintending engineer, executive engineer, and assistant engineer overseeing operations.

== State Public Works Departments in India ==
- Karnataka Public Works Department
- Kerala Public Works Department
- Tamil Nadu Public Works Department
- Maharashtra Public Works Department
- Roads and Buildings Department, Gujarat
- Delhi Public Works Department
- Madhya Pradesh Public Works Department
- West Bengal Public Works Department
- Rajasthan Public Works Department
- Uttarakhand Public Works Department
- Uttar Pradesh Public Works Department
- Odisha Public Works Department
- Nagaland Public Works Department
- Assam Public Works Department
- Himachal Pradesh Public Works Department
- Arunachal Pradesh Public Works Department
- Bihar Rural Work Department

== Responsibilities ==
PWD undertakes a broad range of responsibilities, including:

- Roads and highways: Construction, maintenance, and widening of roads and highways to ensure connectivity between urban and rural areas.
- Bridges and culverts: Building and maintaining bridges to support transportation networks.
- Public buildings: Designing, constructing, and maintaining government offices, schools, hospitals, and other public facilities.
- Water supply and irrigation: Developing water supply systems and managing irrigation projects in certain states.
- Disaster recovery: Rebuilding and restoring infrastructure damaged by natural disasters.

== Main wings ==
- Golden Quadrilateral: The CPWD played a role in developing this highway network, connecting major metropolitan cities.
- Government complexes: Construction of iconic government buildings, including the Rashtrapati Bhavan and Parliament House in New Delhi.
- State highways and roads: Enhancing rural and urban connectivity through extensive road networks.
