= Smart City Surat =

Smart Cities Mission, along with Atal Mission for Rejuvenation and Urban Transformation and Urban Housing Mission, was launched on 25 June 2015 under the leadership of Indian prime minister Narendra Modi by the Ministry of Housing and Urban Affairs. Smart City Mission is one of the pet projects of the Government of India wherein the Government is aspiring to create 100 smart cities in time to come. Surat Municipal Corporation (SMC) is selected for the list of 98 smart cities declared by the Government of India for the expansion of the Smart Cities Mission. Surat was selected in the first round of the selected 20 Smart Cities and has implemented the largest number of projects under the Smart City Mission. It received an award from the Ministry of Housing and Urban Affairs, Government of India, for its work in the areas of urban environment, mobility, transport, and sustainable integrated development. The objective of Surat Smart City is 'to promote cities that provide core infrastructure and provide a decent quality of life to their citizens, a clean and sustainable environment, and the application of 'smart solutions'. Surat Smart City Development Limited (SSCDL) was formed as a Special Purpose Vehicle (SPV) for the implementation of the Smart City projects at the city level. Surat Smart City Development Limited was incorporated on 31 March 2016.

== Tie ups ==
- Microsoft City's next initiative has tied up with Tata Consultancy Services and Wipro so that it can grasp the sustainable growth of the cities in India. The first IT smart city in India Under this initiative is Surat. Surat Municipal Corporation and Microsoft will together transform Surat into a smart city.
- Surat Municipal Corporation has also tied up with IBM in order to provide better citizen service with the aid of the IBM Smarter City program to help them address challenges like waste management, disaster management, and citizen services.

== Projects ==
Surat Municipal Corporation has set up a special purpose vehicle (SPV), Surat Smart City Development Limited (SSCDL), for implementing the developing projects. It has completed 53 works worth Rs. 1204 crores within two years out of a total of 76 projects worth Rs. 2988 crores. A Few amongst the various projects launched by SSCDL are as below:

=== Integrated Traffic and Mobility Administration Centre ===
This center caters to various departments that are involved in the management of the city traffic, such as BRTS, city bus, traffic police, RTO, fire, emergency services, etc. IT applications present with these agencies help them coordinate with each other and manage traffic operations. SMC also serves as a transit system for BRTS and city buses that shows real-time vehicle location and other required information. The Adoptive Traffic Control System (ATCS) in BRTS and CCTV cameras will extend to all the major locations along with IT-MAC. The center is assumed to be a single-stop source in resolving all the issues.

=== Incubation Centre ===
SSCDL has created an incubation centre. The Incubation Centre was inaugurated on 31 January 2019 at the SEPC Building in Udhna. It was set up at a cost of Rs. 2 crores. SMC and SSCDL have set up an institution named AIC SURAT iLAB Foundation to promote a culture of innovation, trade facilitation, and startups under the Smart Cities Mission. SURAT iLAB has 18 partners, including Sardar Vallabhbhai Patel Institute of Technology, Auro University, and SETU Foundation. It proposes to help semi-skilled and skilled job seekers in various trades. The authorities assume that the creation of similar infrastructure shall help in promoting the start up ecosystem in the city and shall contribute to the Digital India Initiative. Recently the same center had organized a 24-hour Surat all-round technology hackathon on 27 and 28 September. The aim behind organizing this hackathon was to encourage startups from various sectors and to get solutions for the city's various problems.

=== SUMAN eye (CCTV Network) ===
SSCDL proposed to implement a CCTV based-surveillance system, "Suman Eye," with a view to monitoring the civic facilities and services across Surat City with the objective of improve the service delivery more proactively. Moreover, the "Suman Eye Project" also intends to improve the safety and security at bus stations, gardens, Suman High schools, and Municipal Board schools.

The Suman Eye Project will cover following locations for monitoring (Taken from the Tender Copy of Project)

1. Municipal Board Schools
2. Suman High School
3. BRTS Bus Stops
4. Public Parks
5. Infrastructure Construction Site
6. Water works
7. Water Distribution Plants
8. Overloaded container spots
9. Water logging spots

The Suman Eye Project composes of below mentioned broad components

1. 2 MP IR IP Dome camera
2. 2 MP IR IP Bullet Camera
3. 2 MP IR IP Vandal Proof Dome Camera
4. 2 MP IR IP Vandal Proof Bullet Camera
5. 2 MP IR IP PTZ Camera
6. Network Video Recorder
7. Video Management Software
8. Server, Storage, Network Switch and other Data Centre Equipment's
9. Pole, cable and other related accessories

== Awards and accolades ==
SSCDL is incidental in the launch of various e- governance and m-governance projects that have been recognized at the national/international level. Below is a Partial list of awards presented to SSCDL:

- SSCDL bags three Smart Urbanization Awards by Smart Cities Council of India at Bengaluru.
- Business World Smart Cities Award 2016 (winner) for SMC Mobile App
- Surat Smart City has been selected for the City Award for "great momentum" in implementation of projects under India Smart City Awards by Housing and Urban Affairs Minister.
