= Delhi Bus Rapid Transit System =

Former Bus Rapid Transit System in Delhi

Delhi BRTS
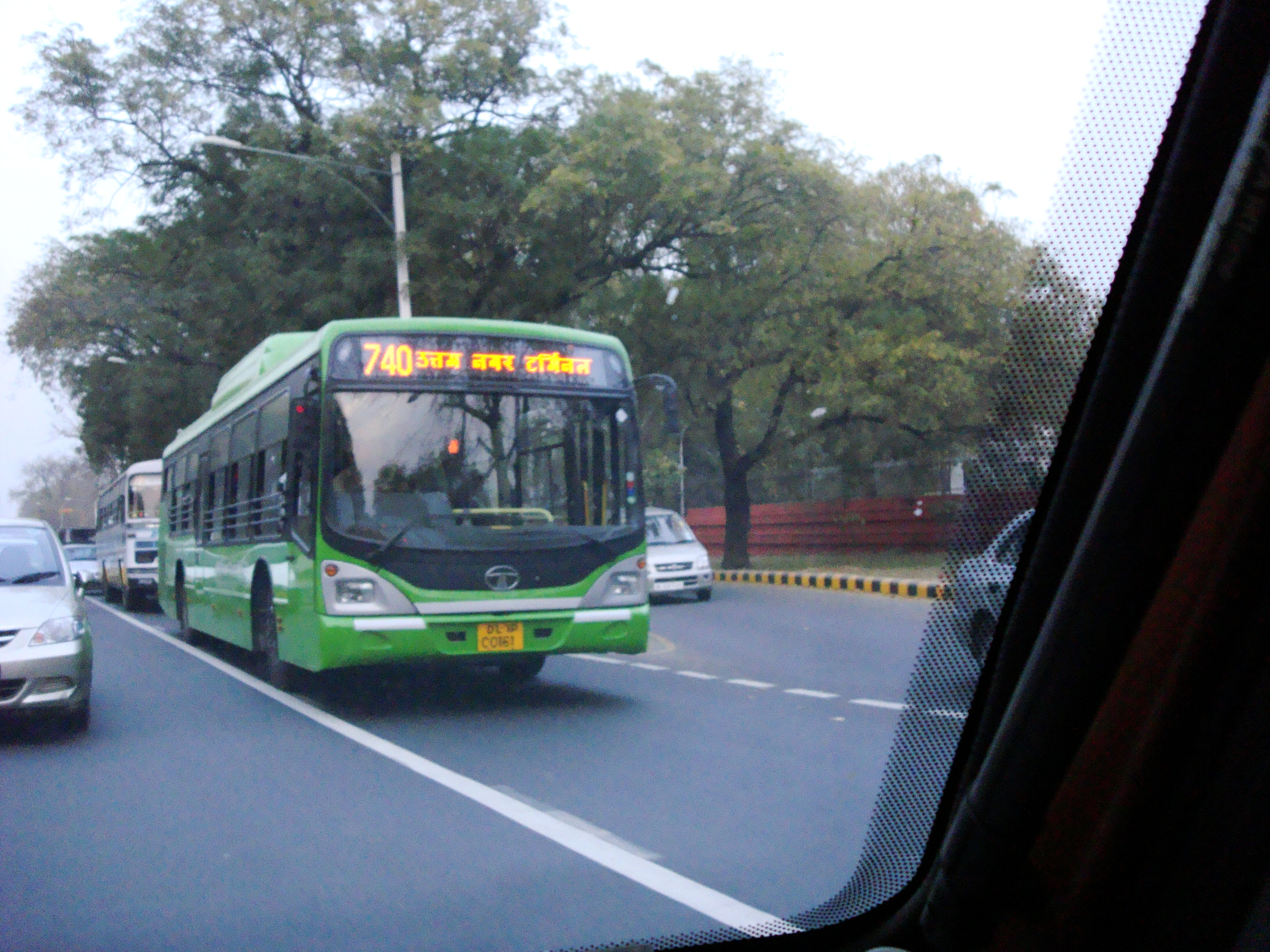
- Tata Non-AC Bus

Overview
- Website: Delhi BRTS

Operation
- Began operation: 20 April 2008
- Ended operation: 19 January 2016; 10 years ago
- Operator: Delhi Integrated Multi-Modal Transit System

Technical
- System length: Phase I: 115.5 km

The Delhi BRTS was a bus rapid transit system in Delhi. The first route opened in 2008 ahead of the 2010 Commonwealth Games, which were held in the city. The project was well used but was criticized for the difficulty of access to the bus platforms, which were in the middle of the road, for lack of enforcement, and for the effect it had on other motor traffic. A legal challenge was defeated in 2012. The Aam Aadmi Party Government had announced the scrapping of bus rapid transit system and it was dismantled in 2016 because of traffic congestion and accidents.

== History ==
=== Context ===
The number of vehicles on Delhi's road increased from 3.3 million in 2000–01 to 7 million in 2010–11; however, less than 10% people in Delhi use private cars, with 33% traveling by bus and 30% walking to work. The length of roads in Delhi has increased by 17% between 1991 and 2008, with flyovers and underpasses built to improve traffic flow; the Ring Road has been made completely signal-free with the construction of 15 flyovers. The Delhi Metro opened its first section in 2002 and, as of 2011, carried 2.06 million passengers each day.

Pedestrians became marginalised and journey times and air pollution both increased. In 2002, Supreme Court issued an order to convert all diesel buses to compressed natural gas (CNG) to reduce air pollution; however, average total suspended particulate (TSP) level is still considerably higher than World Health Organization’s (WHO) recommendations. There is little opportunity to build new roads or widen existing roads, which already make up 21% of the land area.

=== Planning and construction ===
The Delhi BRT system was inspired by a similar systems in Curitiba, Brazil which had been introduced a system in 1975, with similar systems being introduced in Bogotá, Colombia (TransMilenio), Guayaquil, Ecuador (Metrovia) and the Eugene, Oregon (Emerald Express (EmX)). GNCTD appointed RITES and the Indian Institute of Technology Delhi (IIT Delhi) to design and implement a system for the city in 2004. TRIPP IIT Delhi were appointed as technical and conceptual advisors. GNCTD create the Delhi Integrated Multi-Modal Transit System (DIMTS) in 2006 to oversee the establishment of public transport systems in Delhi and operate it on a day-to-day basis. A trial run took place on 21 April 2008.

=== Operation ===
The first route, from Dr. Ambedkar Nagar to the south to Delhi Gate in the centre of the city, passed through some of the prime 'colonies' (urban districts) in South Delhi and was also on the main road from Delhi to the large commercial developments in Gurgaon. A trial section of the first route started in operation 20 April 2008 from Dr. Ambedkar Nagar to Moolchand. Construction work for the full length started in October 2008.

=== Legal challenge and 'mixed-use' ===
The city delayed implementation of a further 14 fast-track bus corridors in response to the level of controversy created by the first scheme.

The legality of the system was challenged in 2012. During the nine-month-long legal challenge the Delhi High Court initially ruled that private vehicles should be allowed the use of the bus lanes on a temporarily basis and ordered the government to review the feasibility of the project. The Delhi government appealed to the Supreme Court of India against the ruling in July 2012, but was unsuccessful. The high court subsequently ruled in favour of the bus rapid transit system concluding that "a developed country is not one where the poor own cars. It is one where the rich use public transport".

=== Closure ===
After 8 years of operation, the system was dismantled in 2016 due to traffic issues for motorists and accidents.

== Design and operation ==
The 14.5 km long corridor from Ambedkar Nagar to Delhi Gate ran along a right of way which varying from 28 meters to 51.5 meters wide. Buses used a bus lane is in the middle of the road which is 3.3 meters wide with general purpose motor vehicle lanes with a width of 6.75 meters to each side. Separate lanes were also provided for non-motorised vehicles, including pedestrians, cycles and rickshaws etc. Buses ran at the same level as normal traffic and share the same traffic signals.

Bus passengers needed to access the bus platforms in the middle of the road by crossing the busy general purpose traffic lanes. Electronic Passenger information system displays were available in all bus shelters with the new low-floor buses on four routes – 419, 423, 521 and 522 being fitted with GPS tracking.

The first route crossed 6 key intersections, including Chirag Delhi, which is one of the busiest in Delhi and also the congested Moolchand intersection. More than 1.35 million vehicles of all types cross the junction in a typical 16-hour day. Approximately 200-250 buses which cross the junction each peak hour carry some 11,000-12,000 passengers (which is 55-60% of the total people movements). A further some 15-20% of people use private vehicles including cars, two wheelers and auto rickshaws and make up 90% of the traffic. Cars/Jeeps constitute around 35-40% of total motorised vehicles.

180 road marshals were deployed on the corridor to guide bus passengers, help children and old people to cross the road, manage traffic, instruct people to follow traffic rules and perform other corridor management activities. The company employed security guards at the bus platforms on a 24-hour basis.

The Operational Control Centre (OCC) at Kashmere Gate and a camp office at DTC Khan Pur Depot monitored the daily progress. A crane was available to remove disabled vehicles from the corridor. On average there were 3 vehicle break downs on the corridor each day. Disabled vehicles including buses were typically removed in about 10 minutes.

== Usage and performance ==
More than 60% of commuters used BRT Corridor mainly for work. Most of the respondents showed their discontent with the previous public transportation system. Respondents preferred to use their private vehicles due to inflexibility and unreliability of the bus system (according to a DIMTS commissioned socio-economic survey at BRT Corridor). More than 50% of respondents desired timeliness of bus service, clean bus and well behaved staff and certainty of bus service. 85% of the respondents, who were currently not using public transport system, showed their willingness to use new BRT system if it is good. In 2012, it was reported that 70% of users were moving faster and there has been a 32% increase in bus ridership.

Phase	Year	Corridors	Length (km)
I	2005–2010	7	115.5
II	2010–2015	3	28.0
III	2015–2020	16	166.0
Total	2005–2020	26	310

== Criticism ==
=== Lack of enforcement ===
While the system was under operation, frustrated vehicle owners chose to violate rules with impunity by using the bus lane, defeating the very purpose of BRT. With negligible prosecution, the entire concept of a BRT falls flat. "BRT as a concept is good, but the success of the corridor depends on how it is implemented. In its present form, it is congested and a large number of violations occur on the stretch that are not punished. This compromises the sanctity of the corridor. People have to be prosecuted on the spot to discourage violations. We have received complaints of pile-ups on the non-BRT lane and the long signal cycle adds to the delay in smooth crossover on the stretch," says joint commissioner of police (traffic) Satyendra Garg.

=== Difficulty accessing bus platforms ===
Along with private car owners, bus users also complained about bad planning. Despite the claims of DIMTS, the agency in-charge of the stretch, bus users say they are forced to scamper across the stretch to cross between the bus stands and the pavement. Without proper underpasses from the central median, where passengers get down or board the bus, a passenger does not know how to reach the bus stop as it's in the middle of the road. Not only are there no proper pedestrian crossings for road users on the BRT, the maintenance of the stretch is so poor that most of the safety markers, like bollards and speedbreakers, are broken and in a state of severe disrepair.

Explains KK Kapila, Chairman of International Road Federation (IRF), a Geneva-based global body for road safety: "At present the buses run in the middle of the road with cars and motorised traffic on narrow left lanes. Since the bus stands are in middle of the road, the scurrying passengers have to board or get off the bus in the middle of the road and have to scuttle to safety towards pavements through the regular traffic lane. This is not the full-scale BRT system followed abroad."

=== Longer traffic signal cycle times ===
At regular traffic intersections, commuters have to wait for transit of traffic along the three other arms of the intersection before getting a green signal. On BRT, the signal cycle was far more convoluted and, as a result, much longer.

"As opposed to normal traffic intersections, there are six different movements of vehicles along the arms of the intersection. The two extra movements are that of the buses on the BRT lane, which means that all commuters using the BRT or even passing through have to wait much longer. As the waiting time increases, the traffic tail lengthens much more than it normally would and there is a corresponding ripple effect on traffic," points out a senior traffic police officer.

This means that commuters have been unable to cross the intersection in one signal cycle. "It takes me at least three green lights to cross each signal of the BRT. Even during non-peak hours, I am stuck in a never-ending jam. Sometimes, I feel like banging my car in frustration. I can walk faster in this corridor," says a much hassled Ratika Dang, an interior designer.

The BRT had created further choke points creating almost half km long backups since 2008.

== Future ==
After the system was dismantled, there have been plans to implement a new BRT in east Delhi along with five other corridors across the city.

== See also ==
- Delhi Monorail
- Delhi Light Rail Transit
- Indore BRTS
- List of bus rapid transit systems
- Ahmedabad BRTS
- Jaipur BRTS
- Rainbow BRTS

== Sources ==
- DIMTS-Bus rapid transit
- Private vehicles may ply on BRT bus lanes
- Road rage: Rogue bikers beat up judge, driver on Bus Rapid Transit corridor
- Supreme Court rejects govt’s plea on BRT
- Petitioner demolishes dividers on the bus rapid transit corridor
- Traffic jams back on BRT
- The Big, Bad BRT
- Shorn of its halo, BRT works better for cars
- Delhi HC orders reopening of BRT corridor for all vehicles
