= Tiruchirappalli Bus Rapid Transit System =

Proposed bus rapid transit system in India

Tiruchirappalli BRTS

Overview
- Owner: Government of Tamil Nadu
- Locale: Tiruchirappalli
- Transit type: Bus rapid transit
- Number of lines: 2
- Headquarters: Tiruchirappalli

Operation
- Operation will start: 2018
- Operator: Tiruchirappalli City Municipal Corporation

Technical
- System length: 24 km (15 mi)

Tiruchirappalli BRTS is a proposed bus rapid transit system for the city of Tiruchirappalli.

== Background ==
During November 2013, at the two-day conference on "Sustainable Cities Through Transport" at Coimbatore, respective city engineers from Madurai, Tiruchi, Tirupur, Salem and Coimbatore discussed the planning and creation of transit systems, pedestrian pathways, cycling tracks, parks, and pedestrian zones. In January 2014, the same was presented to K. P. Munusamy, State Minister of Municipal Administration and Rural Development, Law, Courts and Prisons by corporation officials at a workshop in Chennai. The Corporation Commissioner of Tiruchi City, V. P. Thandapani, declared that about 52 kilometres (32 mi) of pedestrian pathways and 11 kilometres (6.8 mi) of green lines would be constructed in addition to 341 new buses by 2018 at a cost of ₹655 crore (US$70 million).

Modelled on the lines of Ahmedabad BRTS, the plan was developed in association with Institute for Transportation and Development Policy (ITDP) and International Council for Local Environmental Initiatives (ICLEI) is being funded by Ministry of Urban Development would improve the city's road infrastructure and future transport modes, which presently has narrow roads and indiscriminate encroachments coupled with booming vehicle population.

== Network ==
Route no.	Section			Distance (in km)	Status	Notes
Route no.	From	Via	To	Distance (in km)	Status	Notes
1	Central Bus Stand	TBA	Srirangam	17	Survey completed	Planned
2	Central Bus Stand	TBA	K. K. Nagar	7	Survey completed	Planned
