= Urban Mass Transit Company =

Public transport consultancy firm

- Company type: Public Sector Undertaking
- Industry: Public transport consultancy
- Founded: April 13, 1993; 31 years ago
- Headquarters: Mayur Vihar Link Road, New Delhi, India
- Owner: Ministry of Housing and Urban Affairs; Andhra Pradesh State Road Transport Corporation; Infrastructure Leasing and Financial Services Limited
- Website: www.umtc.co.in

Urban Mass Transit Company Limited (UMTC) is an urban transport consultancy company to develop sustainable urban mobility methods and solutions. It focuses on planning, designing, project management and implementation supervision of urban transportation projects. It was founded on 13 April 1993 as a partnership between Ministry of Housing and Urban Affairs, Andhra Pradesh State Road Transport Corporation and Infrastructure Leasing & Financial Services Limited (IL&FS).

== Services ==
UMTC provides advisory and consultancy services for conceptualization, planning and design, implementation, operation and maintenance of urban transport projects. It provides public transit-oriented development plans, plans for city bus services, bus rapid transit (BRT) systems, monorails, metro systems and inland waterways. It also manages outsourced transport operations.

== Sectors ==
=== Policy formulation ===
UMTC helps governments and local urban bodies develop effective policies and legislation.

=== Transaction advisory services ===
Technical and financial feasibility report of a project.

=== Traffic engineering and management ===
UMTC works to increase the efficiency of existing road infrastructure by promoting sustainable activities, such as cycling, walking and providing street vendor spaces. Some of its projects are junctions design improvement in Hyderabad, Prayagraj, Lucknow, Kanpur, Meerut, Agra, Mathura etc.

=== Capacity building and training ===
It helps cities in capacity building. It conducts training programmes.

=== Accessibility and mobility planning ===
UMTC has prepared comprehensive mobility plans, integrated mobility plans, decongestion plans in older cities, transit oriented development plan for Chennai Metropolitan Area, Jaipur, Udaipur, Nagpur and several other Indian cities, to ease and facilitate accessibility and mobility in rural and urban areas.

=== Non-motorized transport ===
To provide first and last mile non-motorized connectivity, UMTC conducted feasibility studies and prepared Detailed Project Reports for development of bicycle tracks, pedestrian walkways and parks for cities like Bengaluru, Bhopal, Kochi, Kozhikode, Vijayawada, Nagpur etc.

=== Rail based transit systems ===
UMTC helps cities develop efficient rail-based urban transit systems. It has conducted feasibility studies and prepared Detailed Project Reports (DPR) for various Indian cities and transit systems, such as Delhi Metro, Kolkata Metro, Kochi Metro, Lucknow Metro, Rapid Metro Gurgaon, Nagpur Metro, rail-based public transport in New Town – Kolkata, Delhi – National Capital Region RRTS, Bangalore – Kempegowda International Airport high-speed rail link, Warangal – Hanamkonda – Kazipet Metro Neo, Visakhapatnam metro, Visakhapatnam Metrolite, Uttarakhand Metro etc.

=== Bus based public transit system ===
It helps cities to enhance bus-based public transit systems. It plans and designs Bus Rapid Transit (BRT) systems, along with prioritized dedicated lanes, accessible station spaces, rolling stock technology, operations and services. It also helps in implementation of city bus systems.

=== Inland water transport ===
It also focuses on inland water transport systems, such as Kochi Water Metro.

=== Parking management ===
To ease parking hassles, UMTC helps in preparing parking policies and master plans for Indian cities like Kochi, Nagpur and Panaji and abroad like Thimpu in Bhutan.

== See also ==
- Urban rail transit in India
- Calcutta State Transport Corporation
- Ministry of Housing and Urban Affairs
- Infrastructure Leasing and Financial Services Limited
- Delhi Metro
- Kochi Metro
- Metrolite
