= Elevated Road, Amritsar =

Expressway in Amritsar, Punjab

Route information
- Length: 4.5 km (2.8 mi)
- Existed: March 2014–present

Location
- Country: India
- State: Punjab
- Major cities: Amritsar, New Amritsar

Highway system
- Roads in India; Expressways; National; State; Asian; State Highways in Punjab

Elevated Road, Amritsar is a 4.5 km long, elevated expressway located in Amritsar, Punjab. It connects Bhandari bridge in the city to canal road near the mall of Amritsar. It also serves as a corridor for Metrobus Amritsar. Metrobus stations were also built along with elevators at major junctions of Bus Stand and Guru Ramdas Dental Hospital. There is also a future plan to extend the corridor till Guru Nanak Dev University. The road was built at a cost of Rs. 350 crores. The entire stretch is built on single-pier pillars. The road also connects commuters to Canal road and Amritsar junction railway.
