= Directorate of Estates =

Indian government agency

- Emblem of India

Agency overview
- Formed: 1944
- Jurisdiction: India
- Agency executives: Sandeep Kulharia, IRSME, Director of Estates-I; Manik Chandra Sonowal, CSS, Director of Estates-II
- Parent department: Ministry of Housing and Urban Affairs
- Website: www.esampada.mohua.gov.in

The Directorate of Estates is an attached office under the Ministry of Housing and Urban Affairs of India. It was established in 1944. It administers and manages the estates of the Government of India. Its main region of the National Capital Territory of New Delhi. It also has extended services in its 8 Regional offices in Chandigarh, Chennai, Faridabad, Ghaziabad, Kolkata, Mumbai, Nagpur and Shimla.

== Estates ==
The department owns and controls many venues along with the Central Public Works Department. It also administers estates in the adjoining areas of served regions.

It mainly consists of the following types of estates-

=== Government Residential Accommodations ===
Providing Government Residential Accommodation to the officers/officials of eligible offices of Government of India is the core service of this department.

=== Government Office Space Accommodation ===
The Directorate of Estates also administers the allotment of Office Accommodation at Delhi and other locations. The office spaces are allotted to eligible central government offices, based on availability of space. Office space is allotted to offices considering parameters like the employee strength of offices, etc.

=== Government Commercial Space Accommodation ===
Directorate of Estates also manages the allotment and ownership rights of INA Market as well as the newly constructed markets in New Moti Bagh and Kidwai Nagar (East)

=== Venues for conclaves and ceremonies ===
It controls and operates mainly two venues in New Delhi -

- Vigyan Bhawan
- 5 Ashoka Road Bungalow

=== Holiday Homes and Touring Officers Hostels ===
Directorate of Estates administers the booking of Holiday Homes and Touring Officers’ Hostels (TOH) of Government of India which are maintained by Central Public Works Department.

== Allotment system ==
The Directorate currently uses an automated system for allotment. All processes regarding bookings and payments are done online. Allotments under the GPRA are based on a ‘Unified Waiting List’ for a particular type of accommodation. In this waiting list, all applicants, including those waiting for initial allotment, as well as change of accommodation, are clubbed together. The allotments are made, based on their date of priority and seniority. Each applicant gets two allotments in each type of accommodation, i.e., initial and change. The prices depend on the basic pay of employees of different ranks.
