= Ahmedabad Bus Rapid Transit System =

Rapid bus transport system in Gujarat, India

Ahmedabad Janmarg
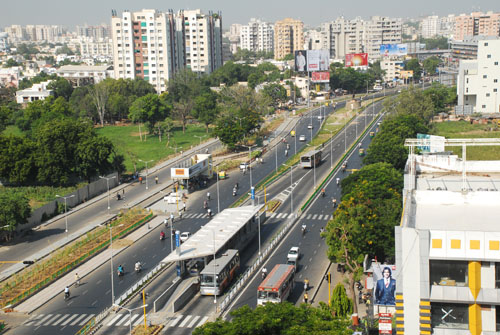
- Bus, station and dedicated corridor near Shivranjani Cross Roads

Overview
- Owner: AMC, AUDA, Government of Gujarat
- Locale: Ahmedabad, Gujarat, India
- Transit type: Bus rapid transit
- Number of lines: 18 (14 bi-directional, 2 circular, 2 shuttle (March 2025)
- Number of stations: 197 (Stations + cabins)
- Daily ridership: 165,000 (March 2025)
- Chief executive: Kirit Parmar (Director), Mayor of Ahmedabad M. Thennarasan (Chairman), Municipal Commissioner of AMC
- Headquarters: First Floor, Dr. Ramanbhai Patel Bhavan, West Zone Office, Ahmedabad Municipal Corporation, Usmanpura, Ahmedabad
- Website: Janmarg BRTS, Ahmedabad BRTS

Operation
- Began operation: 14 October 2009
- Operator: Ahmedabad Janmarg Limited (AJL)
- Character: At-grade street running
- Number of vehicles: Total 380 buses, including 150 Electric Buses.

Technical
- System length: 167 kilometres (104 mi) (with 89 kilometres (55 mi) dedicated corridor)

Janmarg, also known as Ahmedabad BRTS, is a bus rapid transit system in Ahmedabad, Gujarat, India. It is operated by Ahmedabad Janmarg Limited, a subsidiary of Ahmedabad Municipal Corporation and others. It is designed by Centre for Environmental Planning and Technology at Ahmedabad. It was inaugurated in October 2009. The network expanded to 89 kilometres (55 mi) by December 2017 and 160 km by March 2023; with daily ridership of 349,000 passengers. BRTS won several awards in India and abroad for design, implementation and operation. It was rated Silver on BRT Standard in 2013.

== History ==
Ahmedabad has a population of more than 6.3 million and an extended population of 7.2 million. It is the sixth largest city and seventh largest metropolitan area of India. The bus rapid transport system was created to serve a growing population.

In 2005, feasibility study reports were prepared by the state project development agency, Gujarat Infrastructure Development Board, and later by CEPT University. The study was headed by H. M. Shivanand Swamy; an economist, urban planner and associate director of CEPT. The project was sanctioned by the Ministry of Urban Development under JNNURM program in 2005.

Technical procedures were started in 2006. CEPT designed the system after detailed analysis. Based on an analysis of the socio-economic factors, travel demand patterns, road network characteristics, the metro plan and the existing Ahmedabad Municipal Transport Service (AMTS) route network, a network of roads covering about 155 kilometres in length was identified for developing the BRTS.

The system is named Janmarg, which means the people's way in Gujarati. Trial running started in July 2009. The first corridor connecting Pirana to RTO Junction was opened to public on 14 October 2009 by then the Chief Minister of Gujarat, Narendra Modi. The second half of the first phase of the BRTS was inaugurated on 25 December 2009. It was extended to Kankaria Lake later, to cater to the eastern part of the city, and from Shivranjani to Iskcon Temple on 15 September 2012. On 28 September 2012, it expanded from Soni ni Chali to Odhav. The network expanded to 89 km by December 2015 at the total cost of ₹ 1200 crore. The third phase of the project includes the Shivranjani-APMC, Jashodanagar-Hathijan, Sola-Science City, Narol-Aslali and Akhbarnagar-Gota Crossroads stretches. It was approved in 2013 and is under construction. Dedicated buses for women were introduced in January 2016.

BRTS is also integrated with the Ahmedabad Metro. The Gujarat International Finance Tec-City, under construction, will be accessible through this multimodal mix of rapid transport systems.

Several Indian cities are constructing and planning BRTS based on the model of Ahmedabad such as Bangalore, Mumbai, Amritsar and Bhubaneswar.

== Live Tracking of BRTS ==
Ahmedabad BRTS offers LIVE TRACKING of buses in its website

	Tracking	Link
1	Track by Route No.	https://amdavadone.in/brts/route-tracking
2	Track by Station Name	https://amdavadone.in/brts/search-by-stop
3	Track by Bus Number	https://amdavadone.in/brts/bus-tracking

== Transit Map ==
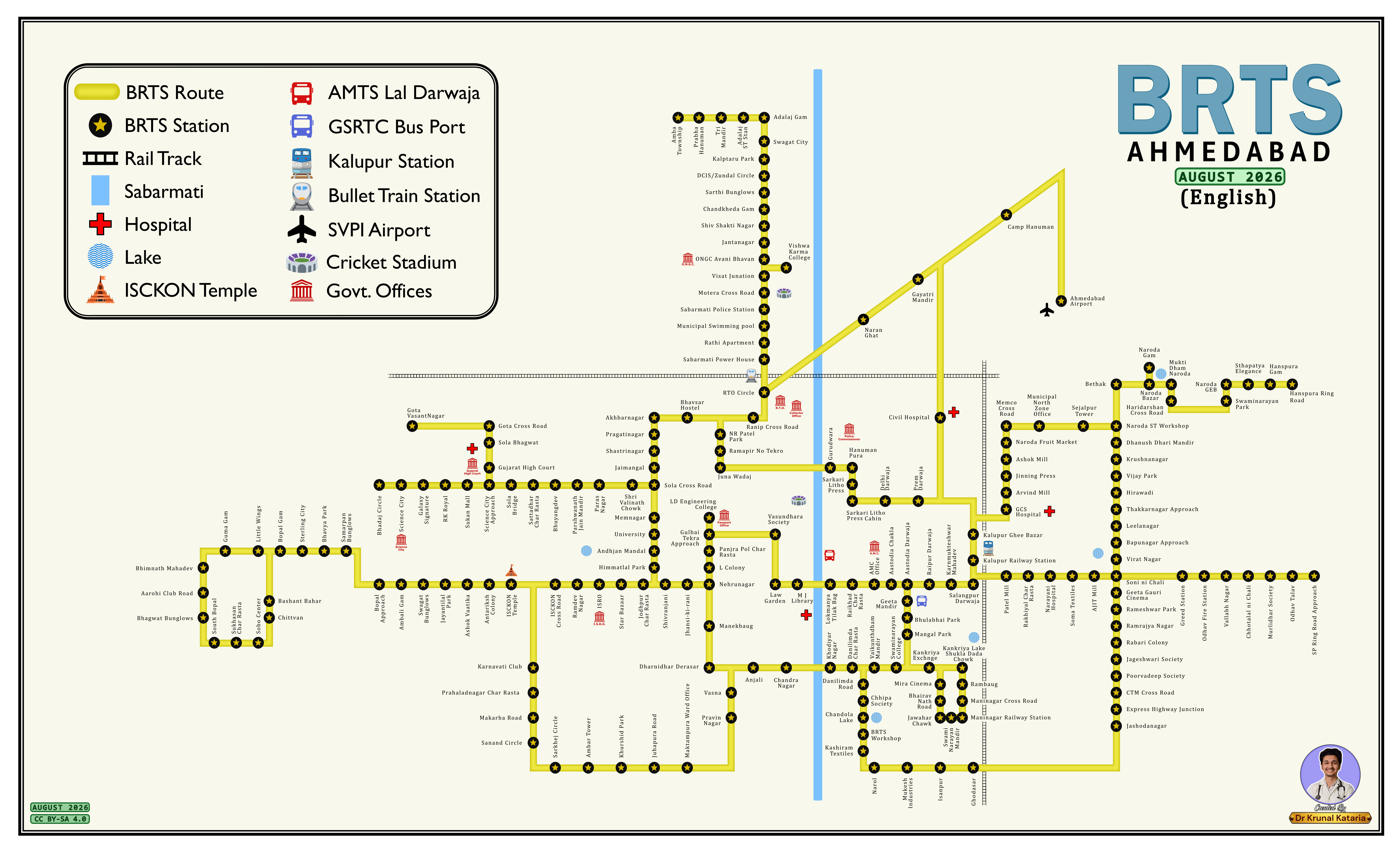
BRTS 2026 (English) Route Map

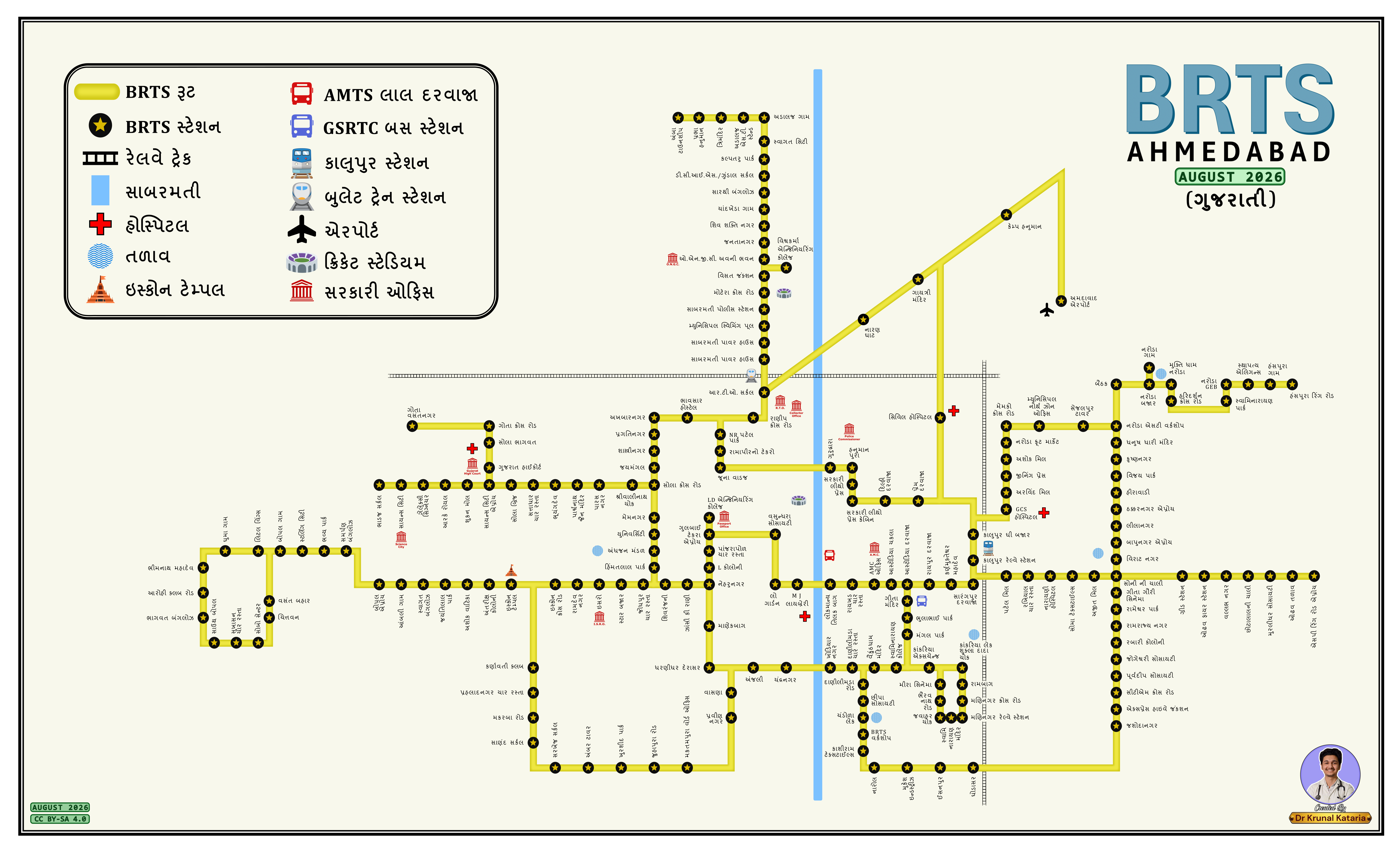
BRTS 2026 (Gujarati) Route Map

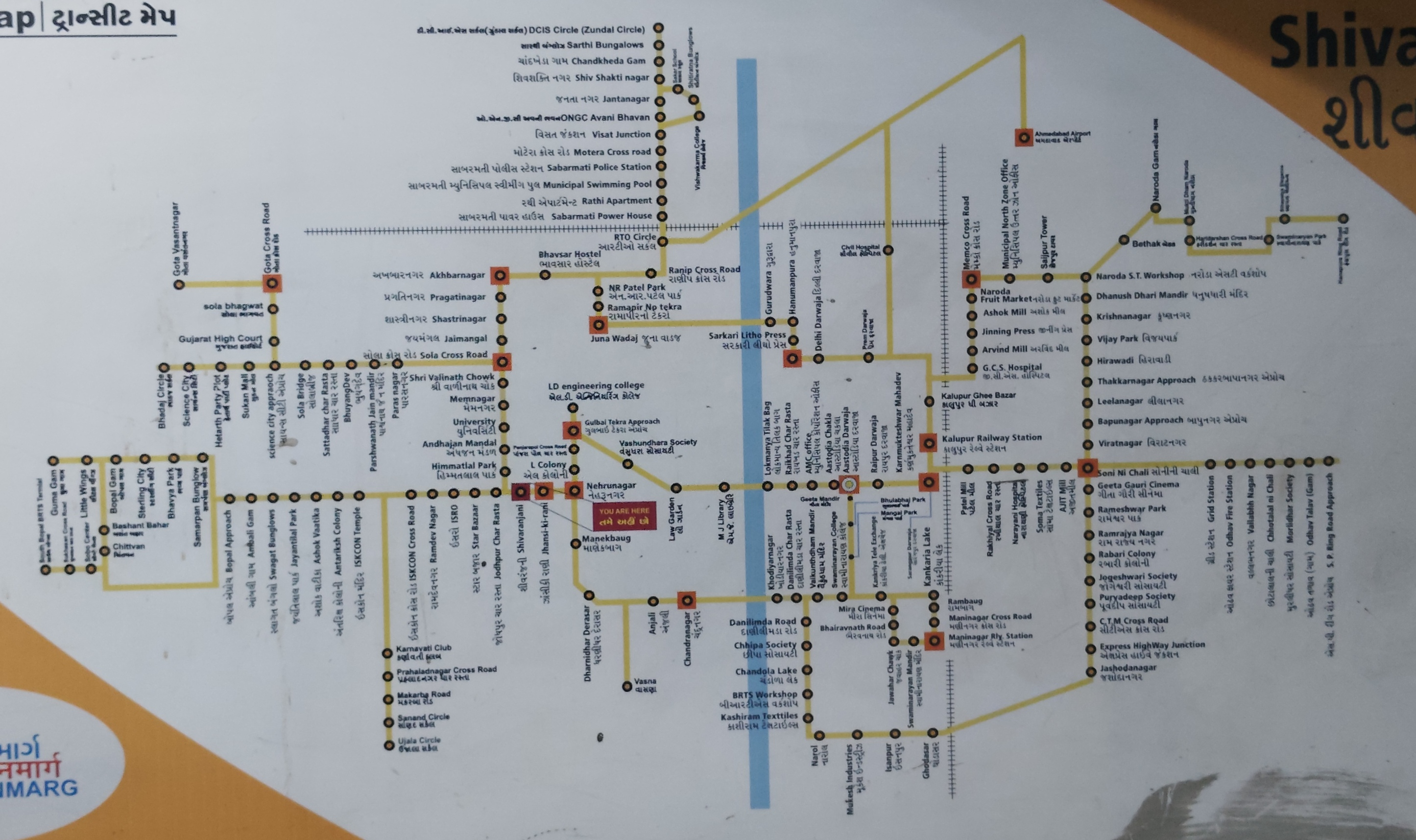
Transit Map (2025)

== Routes ==
As of March 2025, following are the currently operational routes; 14 in both directions, 2 Shuttles (For Airport) and two in circular direction; serving 197 stops (includes 144 stations and 53 cabins at extended routes).

Transit routes (March 2023)
Route No.	Route details
1	Ghuma Gam ↔ Maninagar (Via Anjali)
2	Bhadaj Circle ↔ Odhav Ring Road (via Delhi Darwaja)
3	RTO ↔ Maninagar (via Anjali)
4	LD College of Engineering ↔ Amba Township (Trimandir)
5	Vasna ↔ Dahegam Circle (SP Ring Road) (via Narol, Naroda)
6	Narol ↔ Naroda Gam
7	DCIS Circle ↔ Narol (via Kalupur)
8	Naroda Gam ↔ Bhadaj Circle
9	Vasantnagar Township (Gota) ↔ Maninagar (Via LD, Geeta Mandir)
11	LD College of Engineering ↔ Odhav Ring Road
12	RTO ↔ CTM Cross Roads
14	Sarkhej Sanand Cross Road ↔ Naroda (Via Anjali, Kalupur)
15	Iskcon ↔ Airport (Via Sola Cross Road, RTO, Camp Hanuman)
16	Nehru Nagar ↔ Sarkhej Sanand Cross Road (Via Iskcon)
17	Nehru Nagar ↔ South Bopal
18	Maninagar ↔ Airport (Via Geeta Mandir, Kalupur, Camp Hanuman)
101	RTO → RTO (Clockwise, via Kalupur → Geeta Mandir → Anjali)
201	RTO → RTO (Anticlockwise, via Anjali → Geeta Mandir → Kalupur)

== Operation ==
Ahmedabad Janmarg Limited (AJL), the parent company which governs BRTS operations in Ahmedabad, was constituted as a Special Purpose Vehicle by Ahmedabad Municipal Corporation, Ahmedabad Urban Development Authority and Government of Gujarat. AJL introduced Automated fare collection system through smart cards for commuters.

It has a mixed fleet of air conditioned and non-air conditioned buses. It has 220 Euro III and Euro IV-compliant diesel buses. Parts for the buses are provided by Tata Motors. These buses are built by Chartered Speed locally according to specifications.

The system runs on Integrated Transportation Management System (IMTS) which includes Advanced Vehicle Tracking System (AVLS), Fleet Management System (FMS), Automatic Fare Collection System (AFCS), Passenger Information System (PIS), Passenger announcement (PA), and Vehicle Scheduling and Dispatching (VSD). These technologies are provided by the consortium of Vayam Technologies and GMV Innovating Solutions since 2010. As a part of Intelligent Transit Management System (ITMS), an app based and QR code powered ticketing system was introduced in June 2017.

== Recognition ==
Ahmedabad BRTS was rated Silver on BRT Standard in 2013. It was showcased at 2012 United Nations Climate Change Conference as a 'lighthouse project' as part of the United Nations Secretary General Ban Ki-moon's Momentum for Change Initiative.

=== Awards ===
- National Award for "Award for Excellence in the category of Best IMTS Project – 2011" from Government of India
- International Award for "Sustainable Transport Award – 2010" at Washington DC, United States.
- National Award for "Best Mass Transit Rapid System Project – 2009" from Government of India.
- International Award for "Outstanding Innovations in Public Transportation – 2010" from UITP, Germany
- National Award for "Best Innovation Project Towards Improvement in Urban Mobility in the City of Ahmedabad through New Technological Innovations in Janmarg BRTS – 2010" from Government of India.
- International Award for Design – "Daring Ambition Award and Knowledge and Research Award – 2011" at 59th UITP World Congress, Dubai.
- UITP India Political Commitment Award at 60th UITP World Congress, Geneva on 27 May 2013
- Markenomy Awards 2013 for " Best Urban Infra Mass Transport Project" from Falcom Media at Mumbai

== Criticism ==
BRTS failed to increase the number of public transport users in Ahmedabad. Before launch of BRTS, in 2009, the number of public transport users (users of AMTS) was 8 to 850,000. After six years of operation, in January 2016, it is found that the number of public transport users (combined users of BRTS and AMTS) dropped to 750,000. During the same period, the number of private vehicles in the city increased by 54%, up from 1820,000 to 2510,000. Only 18% of the total population of the city uses public transport.

In 2011, 42 km network of BRTS had daily average passenger traffic of 120,000 which increased only marginally to 132,000 in 2016 despite expansion of network to 89 km.

In 2015, Ahmedabad Jammarg Limited spent ₹ 98 crore on operation incurring loss of ₹ 350 million. In 2015, there are 213 buses with AJL. 80% of them are air conditioned diesel buses which has average of 1.5 km per litre of diesel resulting in increase in air pollution. Air conditioned buses can not be run on CNG and they are meant to attract more passengers. Dedicated BRTS corridors causes traffic jams at several places especially in Old Ahmedabad. As of June 2017, 186 out of 250 Buses are air conditioned. It incurred loss of ₹2.65 billion (US$28 million) in period of 2019 to 2021.

Between 2016 and 2019, there were 22 fatal BRTS accidents.

== Gallery ==
GMDC Station

GMDC Station Interior

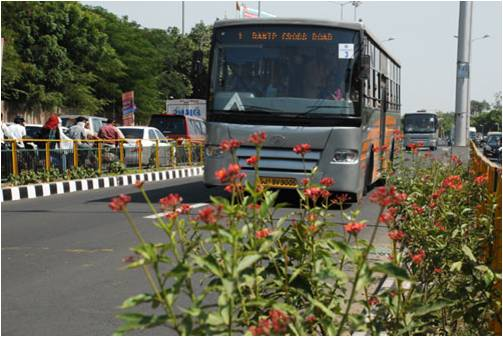
Bus

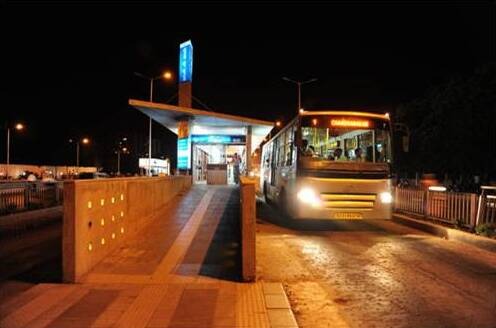
Bus at station

== See also ==
- Ahmedabad Municipal Transport Service
- Metro-Link Express for Gandhinagar and Ahmedabad
- List of bus rapid transit systems
- Category:Bus rapid transit
