= Ahmedabad Municipal Transport Service =

Bus transport service in Ahmedabad, India

Amdavad Municipal Transport Service

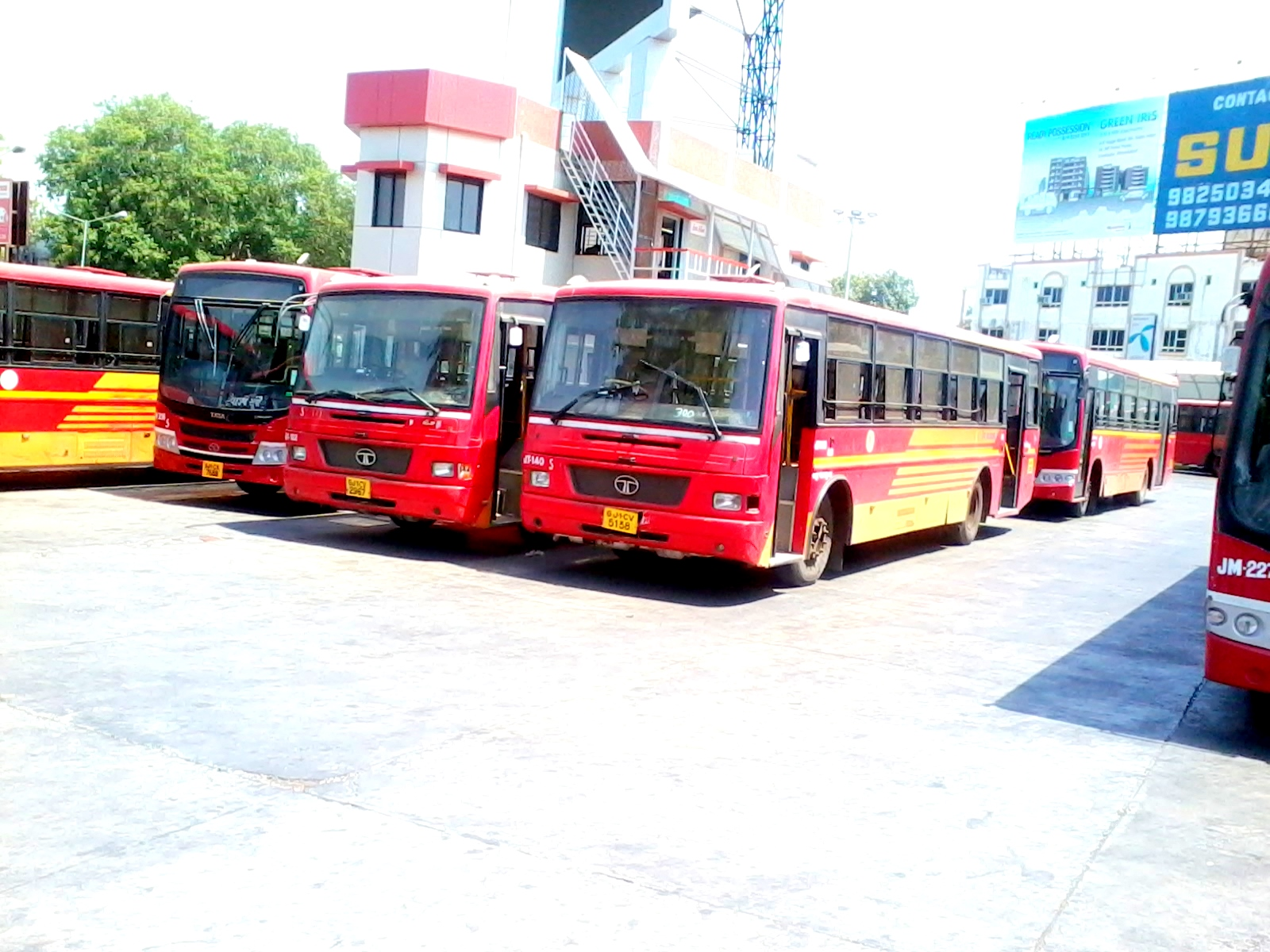
- AMTS Bus Stand
- Parent: Amdavad Municipal Corporation
- Founded: 1 April 1947
- Headquarters: Outside Jamalpur Darwaja, Ahmedabad -380022
- Service area: Ahmedabad
- Service type: Bus
- Routes: 174
- Fleet: 1292
- Fuel type: Diesel, CNG
- Chief executive: Mr.Atulbhai Bhavsar(Chairman)
- Transport Manager: Mr. Rakesh Shankar IAS
- Website: www.amts.co.in

Amdavad Municipal Transport Service (AMTS) runs the public bus service in the city of Ahmedabad in India. The responsibility of the administration of AMTS comes under the Amdavad Municipal Corporation.

== History ==
=== Private operators ===
In the 1940s, there existed three transport services: ABC Co. (Ahmadabad Bus Corporation), Morris Transport and Munshi Bus service, before the municipal bus service. There was a shortage of petrol till 1946 due to the Second World War and the petrol supply was in limited quantity even in 1947 when the municipal bus service started. Coal gas was used as a fuel earlier in the buses and many buses were plying on gas. There were approximately 50,000 commuters who travelled in such buses. Morris operated some 32 bus routes in the city.

The first communal riots took place in 1941. The buses run by private companies closed down during the emergency period, and hence the citizens felt insecurity and difficulty. The old buses were in bad condition, and the citizens pushed for a public bus transport system.

=== Public sector operation ===
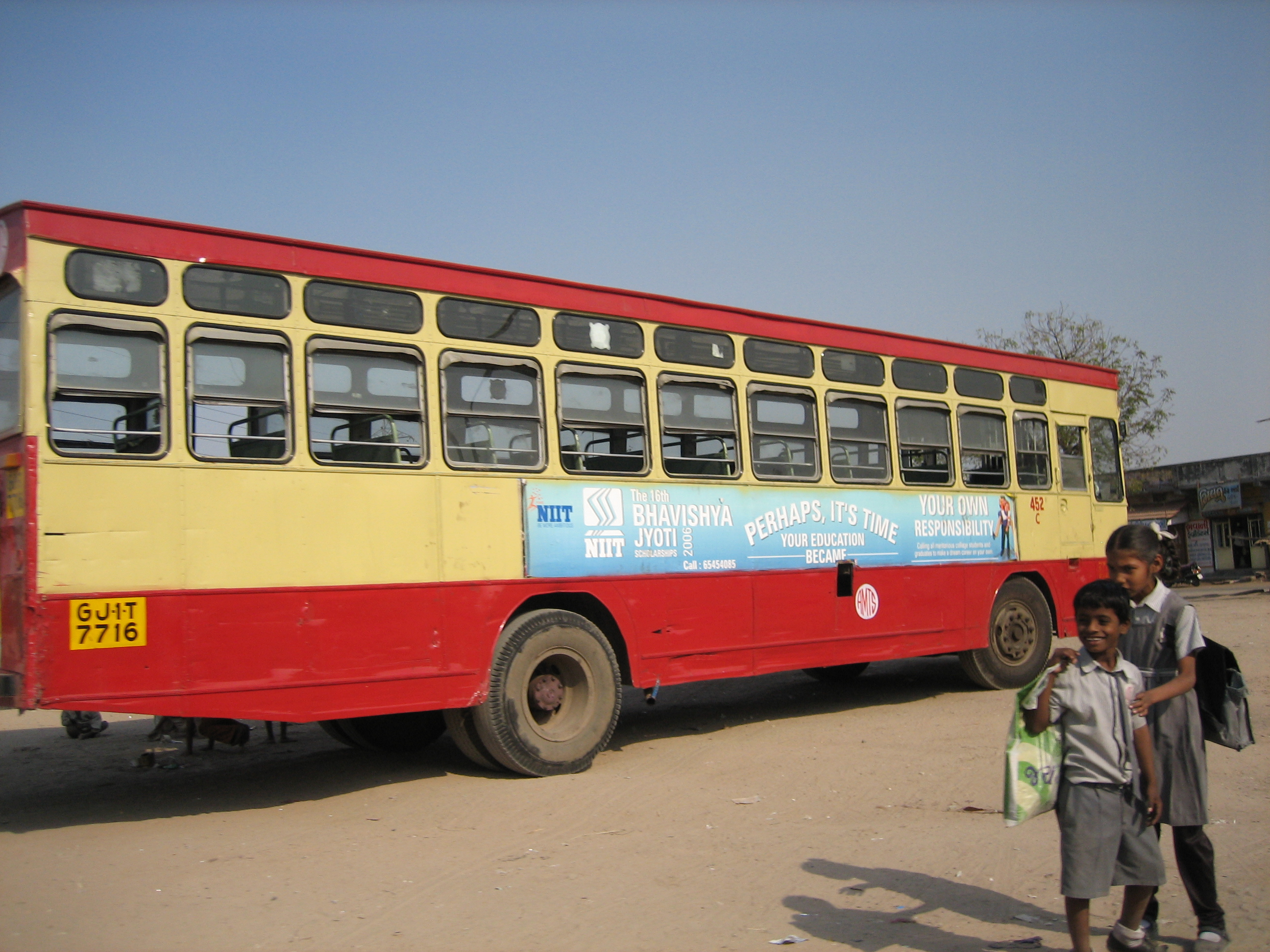
Old diesel buses of AMTS

The new bus service was the first of its kind in Amdavad. Clockwise and anti-clockwise circular routes were started from Lal Darwaja. When the bus service began in 1947, buses were not delivered in requisite number, hence certain buses were hired for a month, to cater for the urgent need, from Gujarat Motors Ltd. on a daily rent of Rs 50. Due to an inconvient body for the city-service, they were stopped as soon as the organization got its own buses. At the end of the year 1951, the organization had 205 buses.

== Fleet ==
At present, AMTS has 1292 buses serving the city in which 977 runs under AMTS & 315 under Janmarg. AMTS bought new updated buses in 2010.
