= Sri Guru Ram Das Ji International Airport =

Airport serving Amritsar, Punjab, India

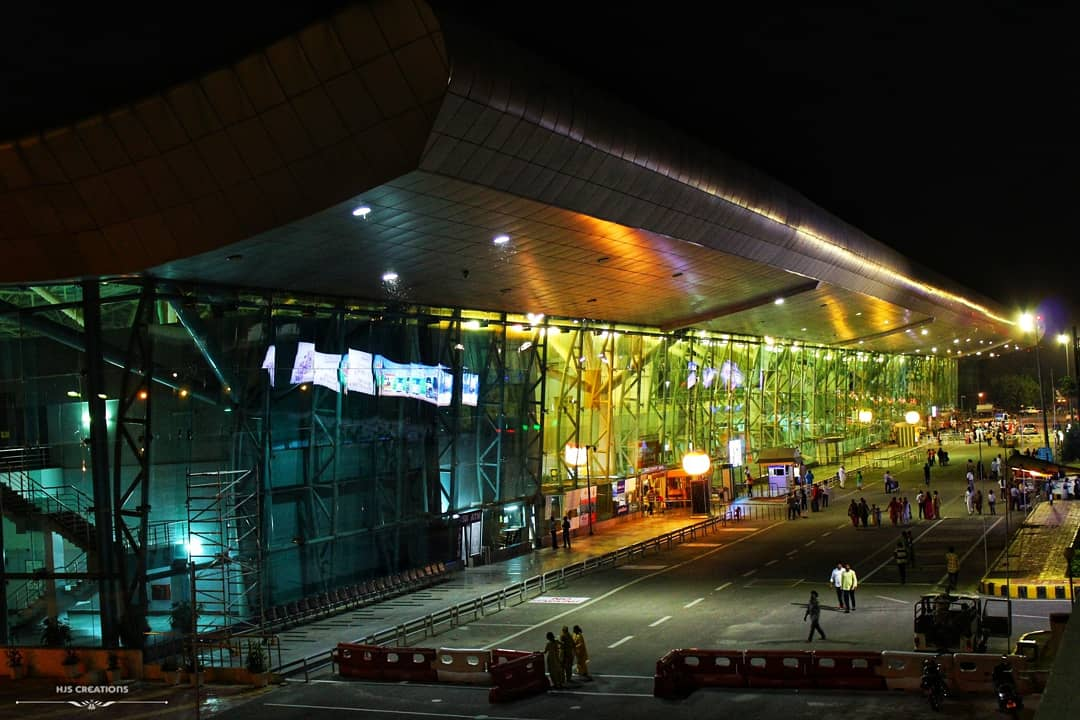
- IATA: ATQ; ICAO: VIAR

Summary
- Airport type: Public
- Operator: Airports Authority of India
- Serves: Amritsar
- Location: Raja Sansi, Amritsar, Punjab, India
- Opened: 1930; 96 years ago
- Focus city for: Air India; Alliance Air
- Operating base for: IndiGo
- Elevation AMSL: 230 m (750 ft)
- Coordinates: 31°42′28″N 074°47′57″E
- Public transit access: Amritsar Metrobus
- Website: www.aai.aero/en/airports/amritsar

Map
- Location of airport in Punjab ATQ/VIAR (India)

Runways
Direction	Length		Surface
Direction	m	ft	Surface
16/34	3,657	12,000	Asphalt

Statistics (April 2025 – March 2026)
- Passengers: 29,41,017 (▼ -17%)
- Aircraft movements: 18,560 (▼ -19.6%)
- Cargo tonnage: 3,660.6 (▲8.9%)
- Source: AAI

Sri Guru Ram Das Ji International Airport (IATA: ATQ, ICAO: VIAR) is an international airport serving Amritsar, Punjab, India. It is located at Raja Sansi, 11 km (6.8 mi) northwest from the city centre. It is named after Guru Ram Das, the fourth Sikh Guru and the founder of Amritsar. The airport is the largest and busiest airport in Punjab. It is the second-largest airport in Northern India after Indira Gandhi International Airport in Delhi. The airport was the 3rd fastest-growing airport in India during the fiscal year 2017–18. It is a hub of cargo movements, domestically and internationally. The airport is ranked the 6th-best regional airport in India and Central Asia in 2019 and 2020 by Skytrax. The airport is awarded as the best airport in Asia-Pacific in 2020 (2 to 5 million passengers per annum) by Airports Council International. The airport also featured in the top 10 airports in India and South Asia with Best Airport Staff for the year 2024 by Skytrax.

== History ==
In 1930, the airport was established during the British era, and was used for VVIP movements. After independence, it got connected with Delhi and Srinagar. The first international flight to Kabul was launched in 1960. In January 1982, Air India started a flight from Bombay to Birmingham that stopped in Delhi, Amritsar and Moscow. The service aboard Boeing 707s linked the large North Indian population in the West Midlands to its homeland. The airline terminated it in October 1984 amid the Punjab insurgency.

In May 2005, Air India commenced service to Toronto via Birmingham using Boeing 777s. The stopover changed to London's Heathrow Airport three years later. In October 2010, the carrier replaced the route with a direct flight from its Delhi hub to Toronto. The following month, the airport's name was changed to Sri Guru Ram Dass Jee International Airport. British Midland International (BMI) launched a flight to London-Heathrow via Almaty in October 2011. The company flew the route with an Airbus A330. The link ceased in October 2012 as a consequence of the merger between BMI and British Airways. In February 2018, Air India resumed nonstop service to Birmingham on Boeing 787s.

== Facilities ==
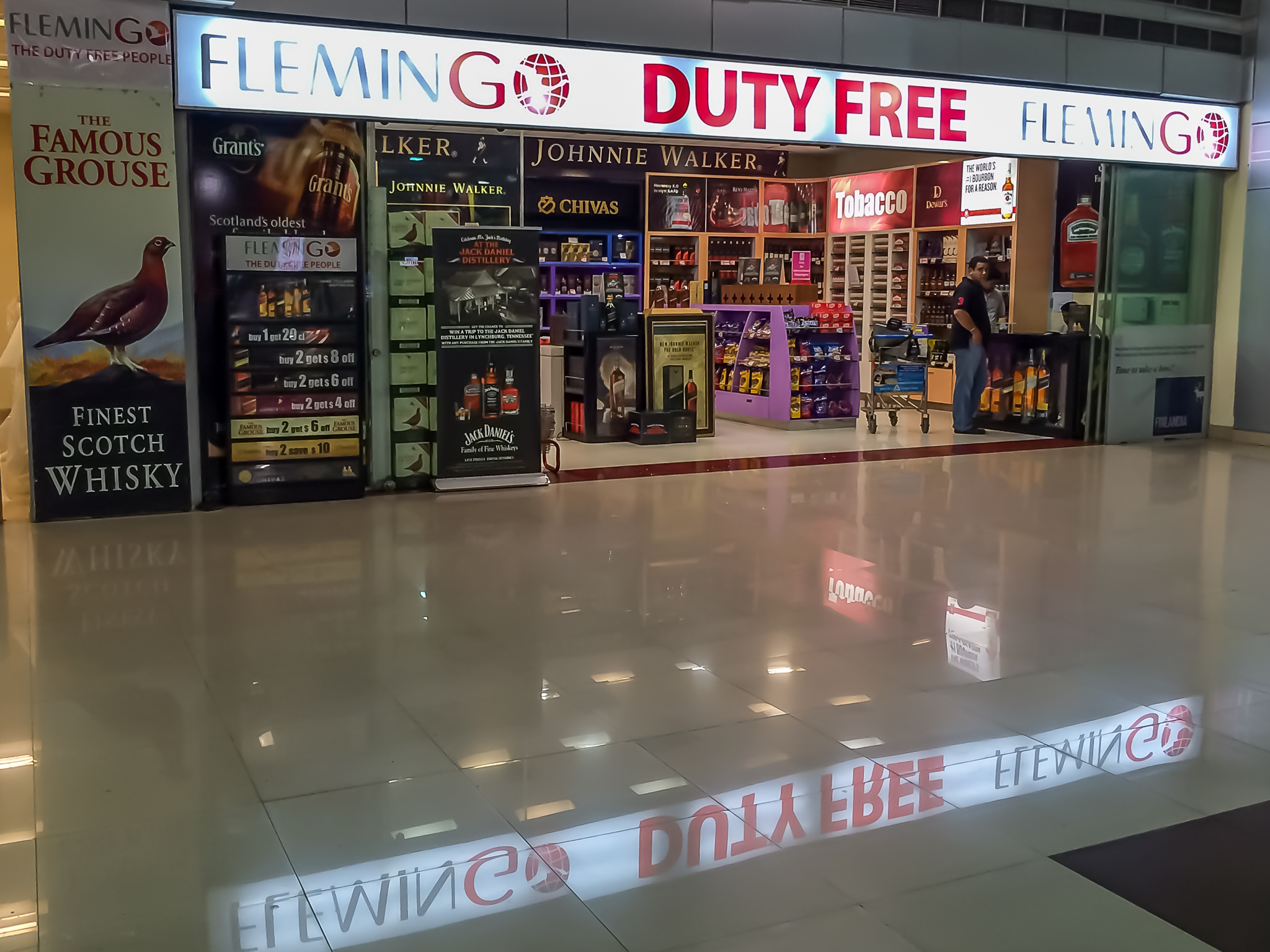
Duty free shop at the airport

In July 2001, the construction of the first phase of the terminal building started, along with the extension of the existing runway, construction of a new Air Traffic Control (ATC) tower and other works. The construction of all Phase-1 works was completed in June 2006. The arrivals section of the terminal building was inaugurated in September 2005, and the departures section was made operational in March 2006. Over the years, the old terminals (existing and Phase-1) were systematically razed, paving way for a new integrated terminal building (Phase-2). The terminal is made with built-in glass and steel and is equipped with an in-line X-ray baggage inspection and conveyor system, Flight Information Display System (FIDS), Common Use Terminal Equipment (CUTE), and CCTV surveillance, which were inaugurated on 25 February 2009, with an area of approximately 40,175 square metres (432,440 sq ft), marking an improvement over the earlier 12,770-square-metre (137,500 sq ft) facility. The integrated building is a blend of modern and Indian designs, constructed in glass and steel with Indian style arches and colours. In June 2016, the airport registered a 59.6% growth of international passenger traffic.

The integrated terminal building has four jetbridges, an annual capacity of 2.5 million passengers with a peak hour capacity of 1,200 passengers. It has 30 check-in counters, 4 X-ray scanners (for baggage), 26 immigration counters, 10 custom counters, 12 security check booths, and 4 conveyor belts for arrivals. The apron has been extended to cater for parking of a total of 25 aircraft (8 Category 'E', 3 Category 'D' and 13 Category 'C' types of aircraft & 1 category 'E' for cargo) from the earlier capacity of 15 aircraft and strengthened for parking of Category 'C' type of aircraft. An additional apron has also been constructed in between the taxiway and the runway. The departure and arrival halls operate duty-free shops, foreign currency exchange service, restaurants and other shops for the convenience of departing passengers. The airport registered India's highest passenger growth of over 48% for the year 2017–2018.

The airport is home to Amritsar Air Force Station, an Indian Air Force deployment location which is home to No. 1 Forward Base Support Unit as part of Western Air Command.

=== Hub-and-Spoke Operations ===
In July 2026, Sri Guru Ram Das Ji International Airport was integrated into the Ministry of Civil Aviation's national hub-and-spoke international operational model, making it the second airport in India to adopt the framework after Varanasi. Under this system, Indira Gandhi International Airport in Delhi acts as the central international hub, while Amritsar operates as a key regional spoke airport.

The operational setup allows departing international passengers on participating airlines to complete single-point check-in, customs clearance, baggage tag-through, and outbound immigration formalities at Amritsar's terminal prior to departure. Passengers transiting through Delhi access designated international transfer corridors to reach connecting flights without re-checking luggage or repeating security and immigration checks, expanding the airport's effective global connectivity to over 44 international destinations.

== Terminal ==
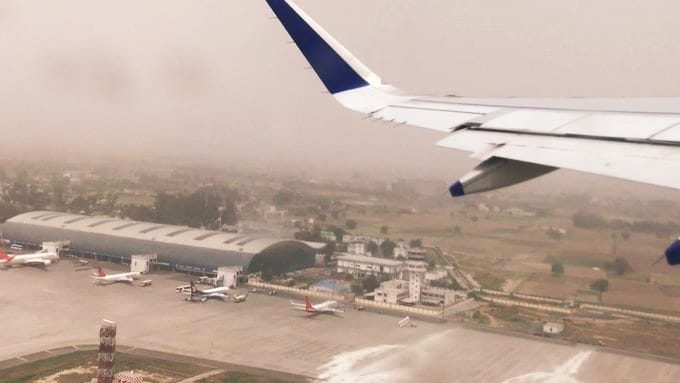
Aerial view of the airport's terminal

The airport is spread over an area of 40,000 sq.m., with 30 check-in counters, 26 immigration counters, 12 custom counters, and two security check booths, and can handle 600 passengers at arrivals and 600 passengers at departures. It has the capacity to serve more than 2.5 million passengers per year. It has four jetbridges.

As of September 2025, FTI-TTP has commenced at Sri Guru Ram Das Ji (Amritsar) International Airport.

== Runways ==
The airport's runway is equipped with CAT III-B ILS, which makes the airport suitable for aircraft landing in poor weather conditions and visibility. It was installed in 2016–17, when the runway underwent a mass upgrade, at a cost of ₹ 150 crore, and in October 2017, the Airports Authority of India (AAI) issued low visibility procedures (LVP), thus allowing landing at within 50 m visual range. Before the installation of CAT III ILS, CAT II ILS was installed in December 2011 and reduced the visibility requirement for an aircraft landing at the airport on Runway 34, from the existing 650 metres to 350 metres, thus benefiting airlines in increased safety and avoiding diversions to other airports, resulting in better operational and environmental efficiencies.

== Airlines and destinations ==
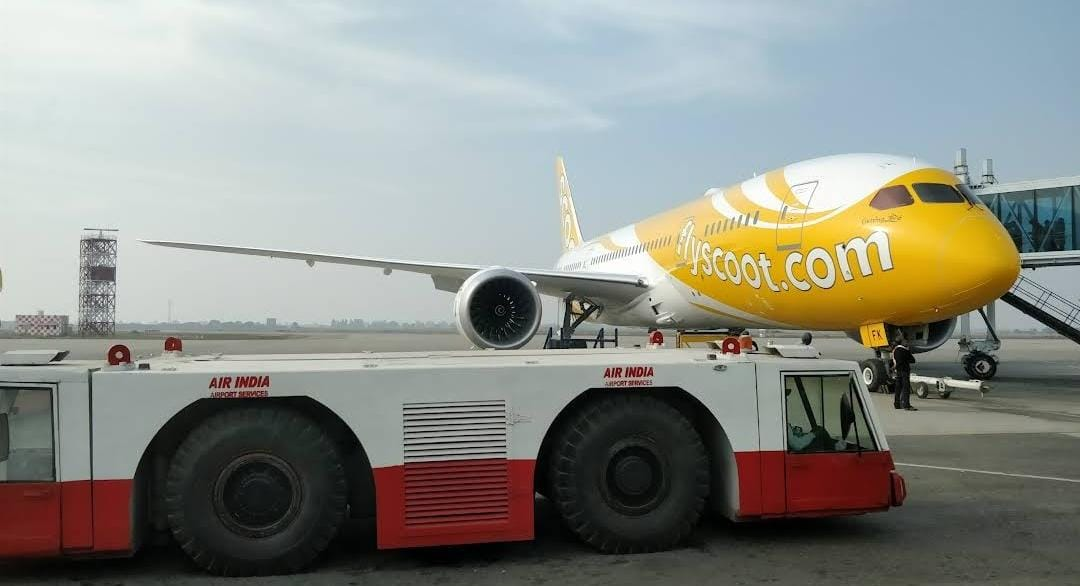
Apron area of the airport

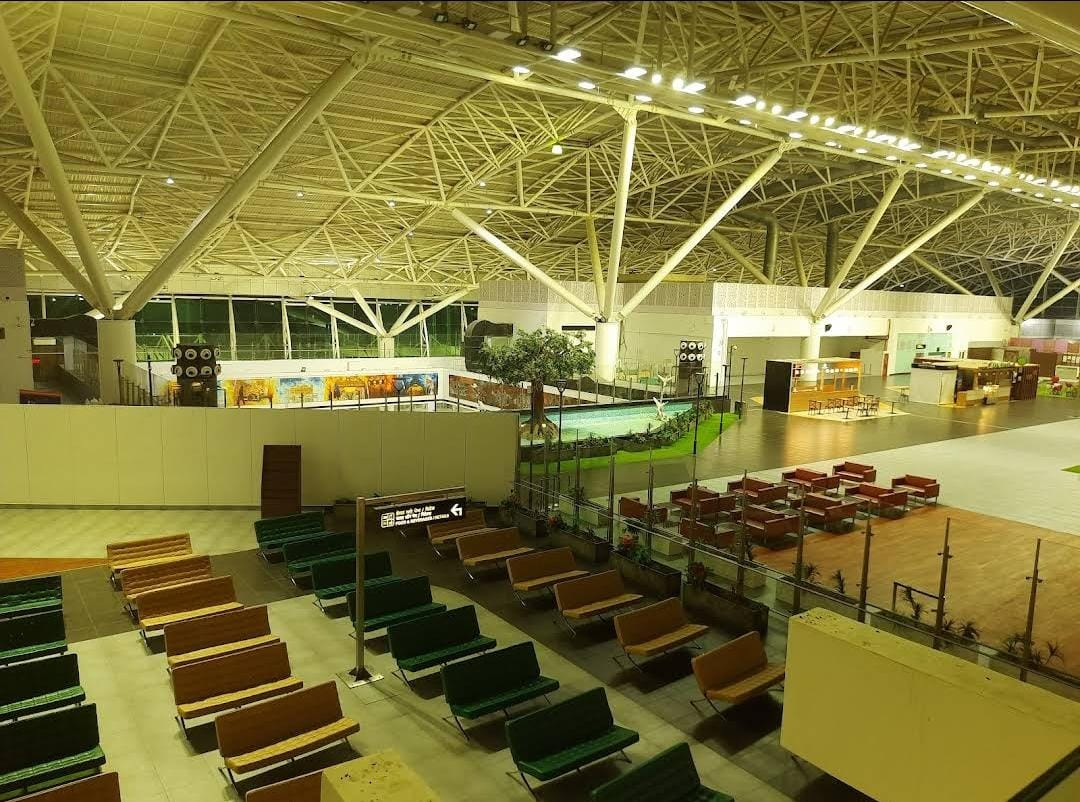
Departures area of the airport

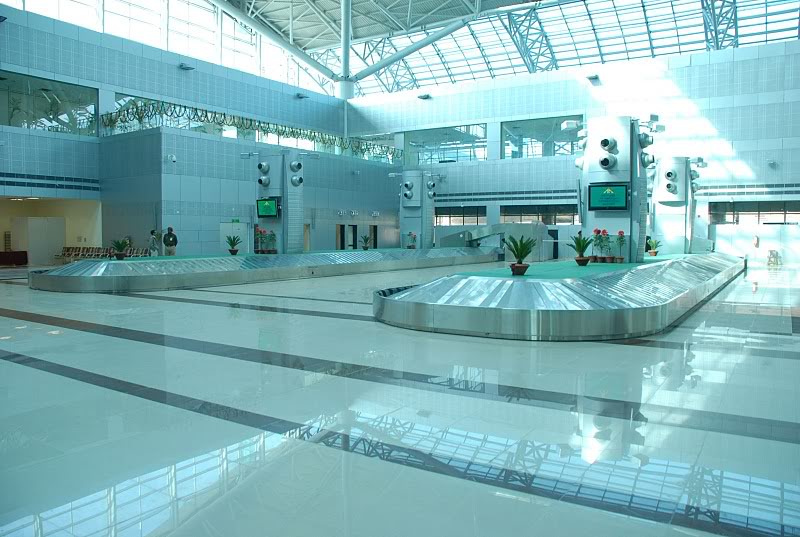
Arrivals area of the airport

=== Passenger ===
Airlines	Destinations
Air India	Birmingham, Delhi–Indira Gandhi, London–Gatwick, Mumbai–Shivaji
Air India Express	Abu Dhabi, Delhi–Indira Gandhi, Dubai–International, Pune, Sharjah
AirAsia	Kuala Lumpur–International
IndiGo	Ahmedabad, Bengaluru, Delhi–Indira Gandhi, Kolkata, Mumbai–Shivaji, Noida, Pune, Sharjah, Srinagar
Malaysia Airlines	Kuala Lumpur–International
Qatar Airways	Doha
Scoot	Singapore
Spice Jet	Dubai–International
Thai Lion Air	Bangkok–Don Mueang

== Future plans ==
To meet the growing demands and future traffic, the Ministry of Civil Aviation has proposed to expand the current integrated passenger terminal at a cost of ₹ 240 crore, which will increase the existing handling capacity of 2.5 million passengers per year to 5.5 million passengers per year. Along with this, an additional ₹ 60 crore were invested for the construction of another apron, taxiways and upgrading of the terminal, which are now completed.

The airport is also proposed to be leased out for privatization on a Public Private Partnership (PPP) basis, along with 5 other major airports operated by the Airports Authority of India (AAI). With privatization, the infrastructure at the airport is expected to rapidly improve further.

With the completion of the under-construction Delhi–Amritsar–Katra Expressway, the travel time from Amritsar to Delhi Airport will be cut in half from the current over 8 hours to about 4 hours. This may result in reduction in passenger growth on this route, but will give better road connectivity between the city and the National Capital.

== Ground transport ==
=== Road ===
The airport is connected by the four-lane National Highway 354, which runs from Amritsar to Ajnala. Both Ola Cabs and Uber are available in the city. Auto rickshaws and local buses also connect the city to the airport. The under-construction Delhi—Amritsar—Katra Expressway will have the first branch from Delhi to the airport, and the second branch to Katra in Jammu and Kashmir, which will improve the connectivity further.

=== Metrobus ===
The airport was connected by Route 501 of Amritsar Metrobus, which connected it directly to Amritsar Junction, Golden Temple and many other locations in the network of Amritsar Metrobus. This route used to operate at a frequency of every 10–15 minutes but it is not functional these days.

== See also ==
- Aviation in India
- Golden Temple
- Amritsar Metrobus
- Amritsar Ring Road
- List of airports in India
- List of the busiest airports in India
