= Uttarakhand Public Works Department =

Government organization in uttarakhand

Agency overview
- Formed: 1992
- Jurisdiction: Uttarakhand
- Headquarters: Dehradun
- Website: https://pwd.uk.gov.in/

The Public Works Department (PWD) is a department of the Government of Uttarakhand in India. It is responsible for the planning, construction, and maintenance of roads, bridges, and government buildings in the state. The department describes itself as the premier engineering department of the state government.

== History ==
The department states that it has a legacy of more than 150 years, with roots in the public works administration that preceded the creation of the state. Uttarakhand, the 27th state of India, was created in November 2000, and the department continues in its present form as a department of the state government.

== See also ==
- Public Works Department (India)
- Central Public Works Department
- Government of Uttarakhand
- Provincial Civil Service (Uttarakhand)
- List of departments of the government of Uttarakhand
