= Warangal Metro =

Proposed metro system in Telangana, India

Overview
- Native name: వరంగల్‌ మెట్రో
- Locale: Warangal, Telangana, India
- Transit type: Rapid transit

Technical
- System length: 15 km

Warangal Metro is a proposed metro system to serve the city of Warangal, Telangana, India with a stretch of 15 kilometers, from Kazipet railway station to Warangal railway station through its suburbs. The system is proposed to reduce traffic congestion as well as providing a modern and efficient public transport system in the city. The Detailed Project Report (DPR) is being prepared by Maha Metro.
