= Delhi Light Rail Transit =

Proposed light rail system in Delhi, India

Overview
- Owner: Government of Delhi
- Area served: Delhi, India
- Transit type: Light rail
- Line number: 3

Technical
- System length: 45 km (28 mi)
- Track gauge: 1,676 mm (5 ft 6 in)

Delhi Light Rail Transit (DLRT) is a proposed light rail system for New Delhi and the Delhi region in India. The Government of Delhi proposed three corridors for the project with a total length of 45 km (28 mi), for which a feasibility study has been completed.

== Lines ==
The following three lines are included in phase 1:

Phase 1 lines

1. Mehrauli - IG Stadium/Sachivalaya (Secretariat Building). (16 km)
2. Mehrauli - Badarpur. (11.5 km)
3. Mehrauli - Dwarka Sector 22. (17.5 km)
