= Amritsar Metrobus =

Bus rapid transit system in Amritsar, India

Amritsar BRTS

Overview
- Locale: Amritsar
- Transit type: Bus rapid transit
- Number of lines: 8
- Number of stations: 56
- Daily ridership: 91000
- Chief executive: Public Works Department, Amritsar
- Headquarters: Amritsar, Punjab, India
- Website: Amritsar Metrobus

Operation
- Began operation: 15 December 2016 (initial); 28 January 2019 (full)
- Operator: Punjab Bus Metro Society (250 employees)
- Number of vehicles: 93

Technical
- System length: 46 km (29 mi)
- Top speed: 21 km/h (13 mph)

Amritsar Metrobus (Amritsar BRTS) is the bus rapid transit system (BRTS) in the city of Amritsar, Punjab, India. It allows easy travel to different places in the city like the Golden Temple, Jallianwala Bagh, Guru Nanak Dev University and Khalsa College for nominal fares. The time gap or frequency between two buses on the same route is five minutes.

== Construction and operation ==
The project was commenced on 19 September 2013, and was launched on 28 January 2019 at a cost of ₹545 crore (US$58 million). Construction work started on 26 February 2015. In September 2016, 90% of the work was completed.

Amritsar BRTS is based on the Ahmedabad BRTS model and was constructed on the lines of Istanbul's Metrobus.

Volvo Buses showed its interest in the BRTS project at the holy city of Amritsar.

The Amritsar Metrobus operates with 93 air-conditioned AT buses by Tata Marcopolo.

The Metrobus recorded ridership of 41,000 passengers in its first week. Amritsar BRTS authorities sold more than 8,000 smart cards to daily passengers within a week.

For the first three months, the project was free of cost for commuters. The transportation system is completely free for school students in uniform up to senior secondary classes.

== Key features ==
Some of the key features of Amritsar BRTS are:

- Automatic doors at metro stations for passengers safety
- Overheard bridges for pedestrians
- Two different lanes for movement of buses in both directions
- Intersections act as boarding places for the buses
- Complete air conditioned buses
- Automated doors of all buses
- Lifts for commuters at metro stations on elevated corridor
- A special smart card similar to that used in Metro Rails
- Smart announcements at metro stations and in Metro Buses similar to those in Metro Railways
- Retrofitted metro stations on elevated corridor

== Corridors ==
Metro Bus's 46 km route has multiple routes and corridors:

- Atari Road – ISBT to India Gate via Bhandari Bridge, GNDU, Chheharta (12 km)
- Jalandhar Road – ISBT to MCA Gate via Tarawalan Pul (6 km)
- Verka Road – ISBT to Verka via Hussainpura Bridge, G. T. Road Bypass (13 km)
- Sham Singh Attari Wala gate and Bhandari Bridge to India Gate
- Bhandari Bridge to Daburji
- Daburji Bypass to Verka
- Verka to Celebration Mall
- Celebration Mall to Sant Singh Sukha Singh Chowk
- 4S Chowk to Kitchlu Chowk
- Kitchlu Chowk to Old Sadar Police Station
- Amritsar International Airport to Golden Temple/Ghee Mandi (launched in August 2021)

In February 2019, citizens demanded service to be extended to Circular road because of frequent traffic congestion in the area.

In August 2021, a new route 501 (UP/DWN) was launched directly connecting Amritsar International Airport with Golden Temple, The new route comprises 14.15 km and 14 metro stations.

== Green mobility ==
Amritsar Smart City Limited planned to add additional 30 Electric buses and 9,000 electric Auto rickshaws for feeder service to the Amritsar BRTS.

== Awards and recognition ==
In November 2019 at the 12th urban India mobility conference and exhibition in Lucknow, Amritsar Metrobus won an award of excellence under the category of 'Best Urban Mass Transit System' from Ministry of Housing and Urban Affairs, India.

== See also ==
- Golden Temple
- Tourism in Amritsar
