= Madurai Bus Rapid Transit System =

Madurai BRTS

Overview
- Locale: Madurai
- Transit type: Rapid transit
- Number of lines: 2

Operation
- Operator: Madurai Corporation

The Madurai BRTS is a proposed bus rapid transit system for the city of Madurai in Tamil Nadu.

== Corridors ==
The following corridors were proposed for implementation.

- Corridor 1: Fatima College – Palanganatham junction [along Dindigul by-pass road]
- Corridor 2: Kamarajar Bridge – Ring Road at Viraghanoor [along Vaigai River North bank road]
