= Ranchi Metro =

Planned metro system in Ranchi, India

Overview
- Native name: रांची मेट्रो
- Locale: Ranchi, Jharkhand, India
- Transit type: Rapid Transit
- Number of lines: 1 (Phase 1); 2 (Phase 2)
- Number of stations: 27 (planned)

Technical
- System length: 16.2 km (10.1 mi) (planned)
- Track gauge: 1,435 mm (4 ft 8 1/2 in)
- Electrification: 25 kV 50 Hz AC overhead catenary

Ranchi Metro (Hindi: रांची मेट्रो) is a 16.2 km planned rapid transit system for the city of Ranchi in Jharkhand, India. It would be owned and operated by state run Jharkhand Metro Rail Corporation.

== History ==
The Metro rail is expected to run on two routes. For First Phase – Routes 1A, 1B, – i.e. Ratu road via Kutcheri Chowk and Stadium to station Point 17 nearby HEC Ltd. In the second phase, Metro Rail services would be provided between Lakshmi Nagar to Namkum via Ranchi Main Road. The Two metro lines will have junction at nearby railway flyover and Ranchi main road junction.

== Corridors ==
=== Option 1 ===
- Station Line 1

Ratu Road - Kutcheri Chowk - Stadium - Point 4 (Sarjana Chowk) - Point 5 - Point 6 - Point 7 (Sujata Chowk) -Point 8 (ROB Chowk)- Point 9 (Rajendra Chowk)- Point 10 (Vivekanand Chowk) - Point 11 - Point 12 - Point 13 (Hatia Railway Station Chowk) - Point 14 - Point 15 - Point 16 (Dhurwa golchakker Chowk) - Point 17 (Heavy Engineering Corporation Ltd.).

- Stations Line 2

Point 1 - Point 10 - Point 11 - Point 12 - Point 13 -Point 14 - Point 15 - Point 16 - Point 17 - Point 18 - Point 19 - Point 20 (Namkum metro station).

=== Option 2 ===
kokar -- lalpur -- main road -- ratu road

=== Option 3 ===
No.	Station name	Inter-station distance (km)	Cumulative distance (km)	Layout	Status
1	ITI Bus Terminal Metro Station			Elevated	Planned
2	Piska More Metro Station			Elevated	Planned
3	Kutchery Chowk Metro Station			Underground	Planned
4	Kanta Toli Chowk Metro Station			Elevated	Planned
5	Namkum Metro Station Near Namkum Police Station			Elevated	Planned
6	Ranchi University Metro Station			Elevated	Planned
7	Albert Ekka Chowk Metro Station			Elevated	Planned
8	Sainik Market Metro Station			Elevated	Planned
9	Ranchi Metro Station			Elevated	Planned
10	Rajender Chowk Metro Station			Elevated	Planned
11	Mecon Metro Station			Elevated	Planned
12	Shivpuri Metro Station			Elevated	Planned
13	Hinoo Chowk Metro Station			Elevated	Planned
14	Birsa Chowk Metro Station			Underground	Planned
15	Hatia Metro Station			Elevated	Planned
16	Vishvnath Saha Deo Chowk Metro Station			Elevated	Planned
17	JSCA Stadium Metro Station			Elevated	Planned
18	CRPF Metro Station			Elevated	Planned

== See also ==
- Urban rail transit in India
