= Mumbai Bus Rapid Transit System =

Bus rapid transit system in Mumbai, India

Mumbai BRTS

Overview
- Locale: Mumbai, India
- Transit type: Bus rapid transit
- Number of lines: 1 (planned)

Operation
- Operator: Brihanmumbai Electric Supply and Transport

Mumbai BRTS is a planned bus rapid transit system in Mumbai, India.

== History ==
The project was taken up by the MCGM, BEST, and MMRDA to ease the traffic conditions of Mumbai and improve bus services. A BRTS fleet consisting of the BEST Undertaking's CNG powered JCBL Cerita buses, Tata Starbuses, and Tata Marcopolo Buses was introduced in 2008. However, the BRTS did not have dedicated lanes and had to share roads with regular traffic with no right of way privileges. This resulted in a system that was a BRTS only in name.

The project to provide a BRTS with dedicated lanes was first proposed in 2003.

On 7 September 2012, BEST announced that it would build a BRTS with dedicated lanes on Ghatkopar-Mankhurd Link Road (GMLR). The project will cost ₹2,070.9 million (US$22 million) and will require widening the GMLR and paving the service road with concrete.

Bus routes for Mumbai can be viewed at mumbaibusroutes.in.

In 2015 it was revealed that Mumbai's first BRTS corridor would actually be along the Western Express Highway. BRTS service is also planned for the Eastern Express Highway.

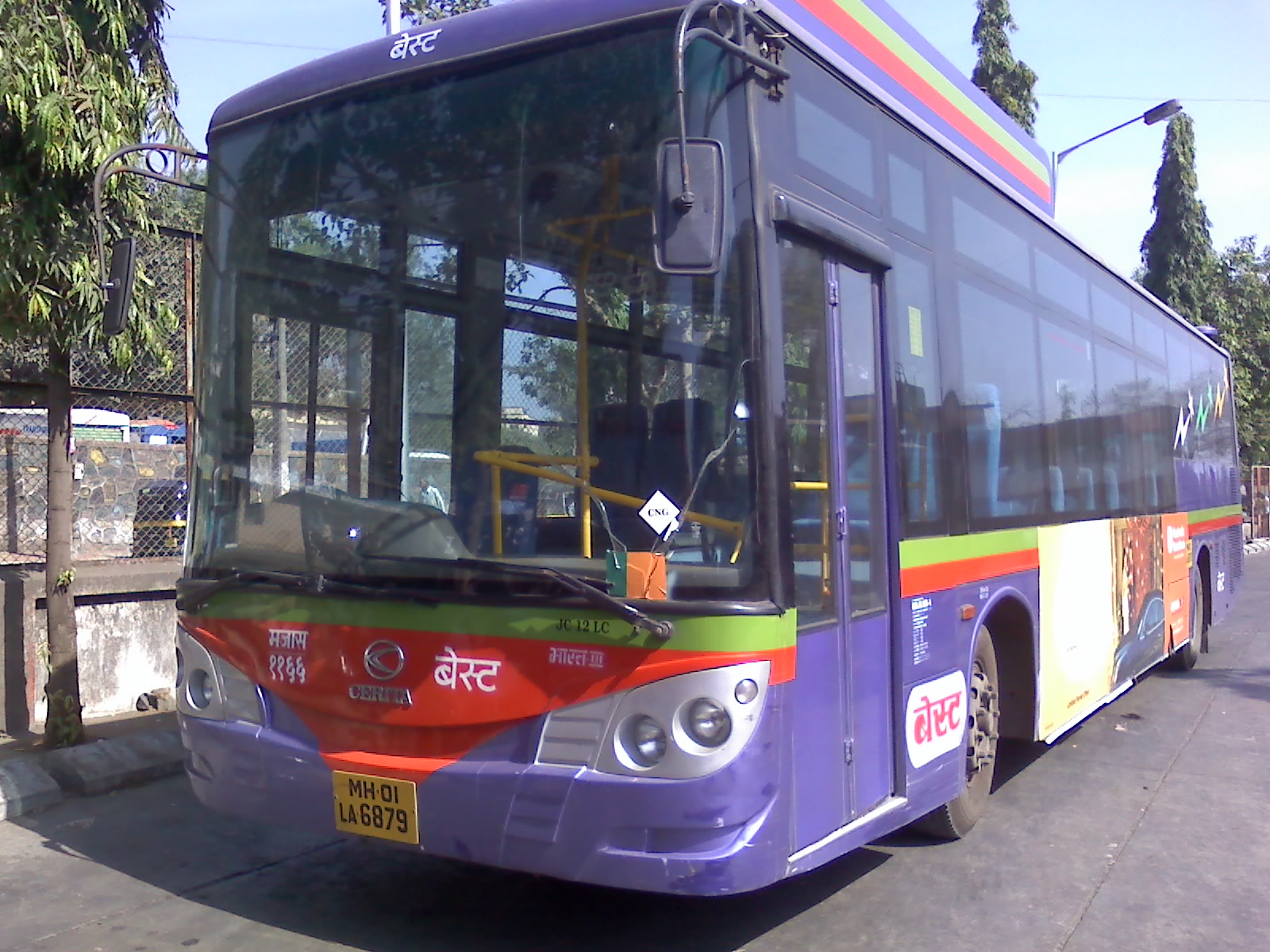
BEST air-conditioned King Long bus

== See also ==
- Transport in Mumbai
  - BEST
  - Mumbai Suburban Railway
  - Mumbai Metro
  - Mumbai Monorail
- List of bus rapid transit systems in India
