= Central Public Works Department =

Department of India's central government for infrastructure

Service Overview
- Abbreviation: CPWD
- Formed: 1854 (172 years ago)
- Country: India
- Group 'A' Services: Central Engineering Service (CES); Central Electrical & Mechanical Engineering Service (CEMES); Central Architects Service (CAS)
- Training Ground: National CPWD Academy, Ghaziabad
- Cadre Controlling Authority: Department of Capital Development, Ministry of Housing and Urban Affairs, GOI
- Minister Responsible: Shri Manohar Lal, Minister of Housing and Urban Affairs
- Legal personality: Government of India
- Duties: Construction and Maintenance of Government Infrastructure
- Cadre strength: 14435 approx
- Mode of Selection: Indian Engineering Services Exam for Group 'A' Post UPSC Exam for Deputy Architect Group 'A' Post Staff Selection Commission JE Exam for Group 'B' Post
- Notable Officers: DG, SDGs, ADGs
- Website: www.cpwd.gov.in
- Headquarter: Vidyut Bhawan, Shankar Market, Connaught Place New Delhi -110001.

The Central Public Works Department (CPWD) is a department under the Ministry of Housing and Urban Affairs of India and is in charge of public sector works. It serves as the builder, developer and manager of Central government properties. With time, its area of operations has also expanded to roadways and Bridge engineering.

It is headed by the Director General (DG), who is also the Principal Technical Advisor to the Government of India. The regions and sub-regions are headed by Special DGs and Additional DGs, respectively, while the zones in all state capitals (except a few) are headed by the Chief Engineers. Nowadays, a Chief Project Manager (CPM) is also there to head major prestigious projects of CPWD. CPMs was equivalent to the rank of Chief Engineers in CPWD. The Chief Architect of CPWD also acts as the chairman of the local body to approve the Government Buildings. With a country -wide presence, the strength of CPWD is its ability to undertake the construction of Complex Projects even in difficult terrains and maintenance in post construction stage.

CPWD consists of three wings in execution field – B&R (Buildings and Roads), E&M (Electrical and Mechanical) and horticulture.

== History ==
Centralised public works in India can be traced to the efforts of Lord Dalhousie and Sir Arthur Cotton in the mid 19th century. Sir Arthur Cotton sumed up the early policy of the East India Company rulers thus,

Public works have been almost entirely neglected throughout India. The motto hitherto has been: Do nothing, have nothing done, let nobody do anything. Bear any loss, let the people die of famine, let hundreds of lakhs be lost in revenue for want of water or roads, rather than do anything.

– Arthur Cotton (1854)

Lord Dalhousie established the Central Public Works Department, and irrigation projects were among the earliest to be started.

The Public Works Department was formally established in the year 1854 in the sixth year of Lord Dalhousie's tenure as Governor General. In the minutes of the meeting held on 12 July 1854, the Governor General resolved that a central agency be provided by creating an office of Secretary to the Government of India in the Department of Public Works. The note recorded by Lord Dalhousie was as follows:

“The organisation of the Department of Public Works in the Indian Empire will be incomplete unless it shall be provided for the Supreme Government itself come into agency by which it may be enabled to exercise the universal control confided to it over public works in India with the best of scientific knowledge, authority, and system. The Government of India shall no longer be dependent on expedients, but should be provided with a permanent and highly qualified agency to assist in the direction of this important branch of public affairs. I have, therefore, now to propose that such an agency should be provided by creating an office of the Secretary to the Government of India in the Department of Public Works. The person who holds it should always be a highly qualified officer of the Corps of Engineers.”

Colonel W.E. Baker of the Bengal Engineers was accordingly appointed first Secretary to the Department of Public Works, this is the genesis of the Central Public Works Department. Sir Teja Singh Malik was the first Indian head of the CPWD.

CPWD has PAN India presence and has ability to undertake construction of complex projects even in difficult terrain and maintenance in post construction stage. In 1954, the CPWD played an important role in the International Exhibition on Low-Cost Housing held in New Delhi. The exhibition was sponsored by the Ministry of Housing and Urban Affairs, known as the Ministry of Works, Housing & Supply at the time. The CPWD put on display 12 full-scale models of cheap housing. The CPWD also adopted one of the housing designs created by Habib Rahman, who was Senior Architect in the CPWD, for the construction of quarters in New Delhi. CPWD had been involved in construction of stadiums and other infrastructure requirements for Asian Games 1982 and Commonwealth Games 2010.

== Functions of CPWD ==
Following are the core functions of CPWD

- Design, construction and maintenance of Central Government non- residential buildings other than those for Railways, Communications, Atomic Energy, Defense Services, All India Radio, Doordarshan and Airports (IAAI & NAA).
- Construction and maintenance of residential accommodation meant for Central Government Employees.
- Construction works for Central Armed Police Forces
- Construction works for establishments under the Cabinet Secretariat i.e. SSB, SIB etc.
- Construction works for public sector undertakings not having their engineering organization, other Government Organisations, Autonomous bodies and institutions as deposit work. “Deposit Works” are such works, which are undertaken at the discretion of the Director General, CPWD for which the outlay is provided wholly or in part from
  - a) Funds of a public nature but not included in the financial estimates and accounts of the Union of India.
  - b) Contributions from the public.
- Providing consultancy services in planning, designing and construction of civil engineering projects, as and when required by public undertaking and other autonomous bodies.
- Construction of Embassy and other buildings / projects abroad at the request of Ministry of External Affairs and other Ministries.
- Defence / Security related works assigned by the government such as border fencing & flood lighting works and Indo China Border Road Works (ICBR).
- Construction of roads under PMGSY and RSVY programme. To undertake works under PPP/Alternate Funding mode.

=== Consultation & advisory functions ===
The Director General of CPWD functions as Technical Advisor to the Government of India and is consulted in various technical matters relating to construction and maintenance. The Ministry of External Affairs consults CPWD with regard to construction and maintenance of the Embassy buildings abroad. As Technical Advisor to the Government of India, the Director General of CPWD or his nominee is associated with technical bodies and / or Standing Committees of various Institutions and Organisations. Some of the important organizations are:

1. Central Building Research Institute, Roorkee
2. Hindustan Prefab Limited, Delhi
3. Indian Institute of Technology, Delhi
4. Indian Agricultural Research Institute, Delhi
5. Indian National Group of the International Association for Bridges & Structural Engineering
6. Indian National Society of Soil Mechanics and Foundation Engineering
7. Indian Roads Congress
8. Bureau of Indian Standards
9. Indian Institute of Public Administration
10. Indian Council for Foresting Research Education
11. National Buildings Organisation
12. National Productivity Council
13. National Defence Academy, Khadakvasla
14. Central University of Rajasthan
15. Central University of Haryana

== Recruitment ==
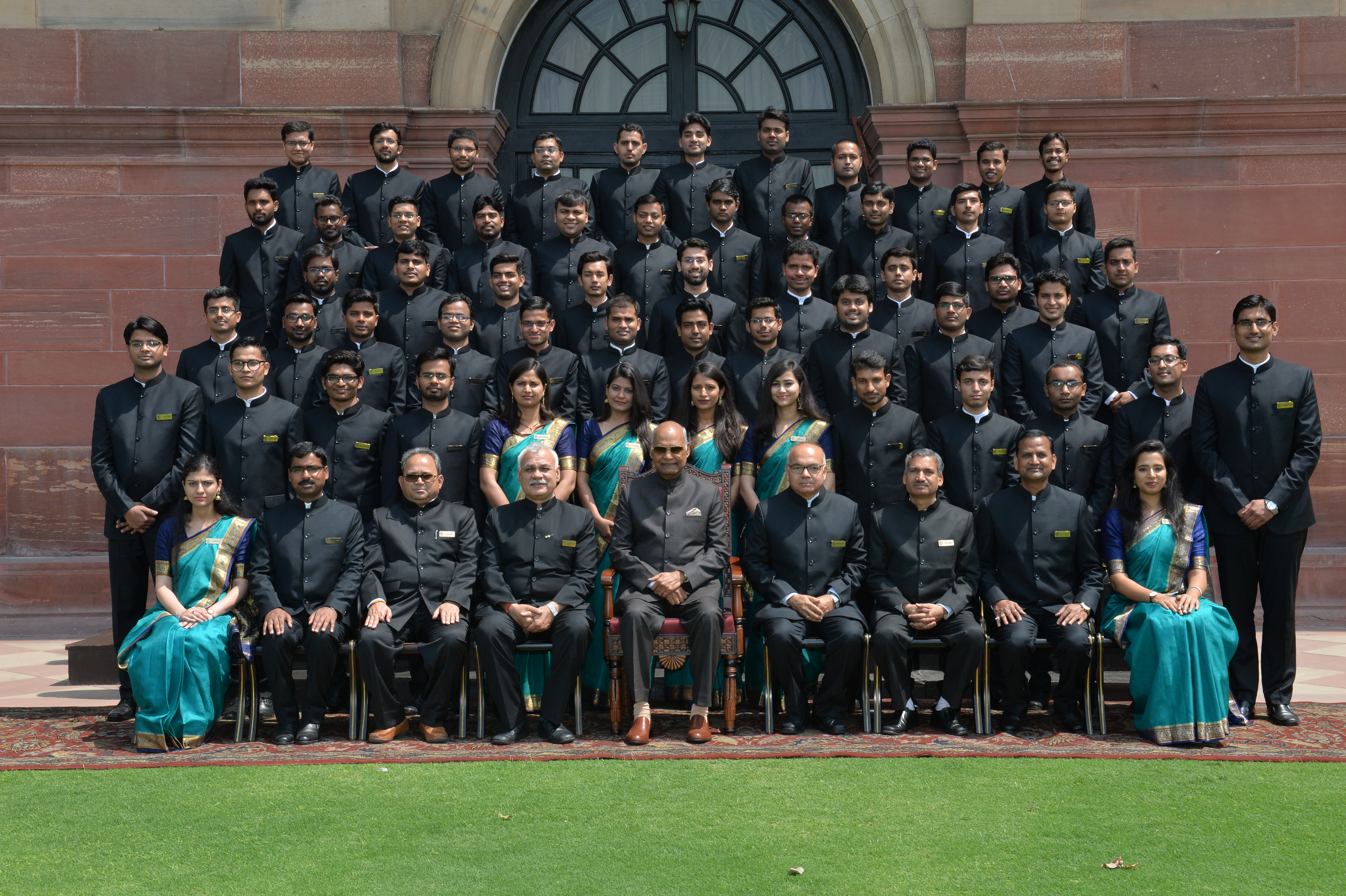
CPWD officers batch with the President of India at the end of Foundation Training

The recruitment as entry level for middle management is made through Engineering Services Examination (ESE)/ Architects Group 'A' Recruitment conducted by Union Public Service Commission. Only top candidates in ESE get a chance to join CPWD strictly on merit basis. During probation period, the selected candidates undergo rigorous training of 52 weeks at National CPWD Academy situated in Ghaziabad (U.P). which transforms them into competent Architects/Engineers cum bureaucrats. During the normal career progression one rises to Chief Architect/Engineer, then to Additional Director General and further to Special Director General. The apex level post in CPWD is of Director General, CPWD who also acts as technical advisor to the Government of India. Recently the Government of India has given the approval for creation of one more post of Director General (Planning). So from now onwards CPWD has two Director General Posts.

There are three cadres in CPWD:

1) CAS (Central Architects Services)

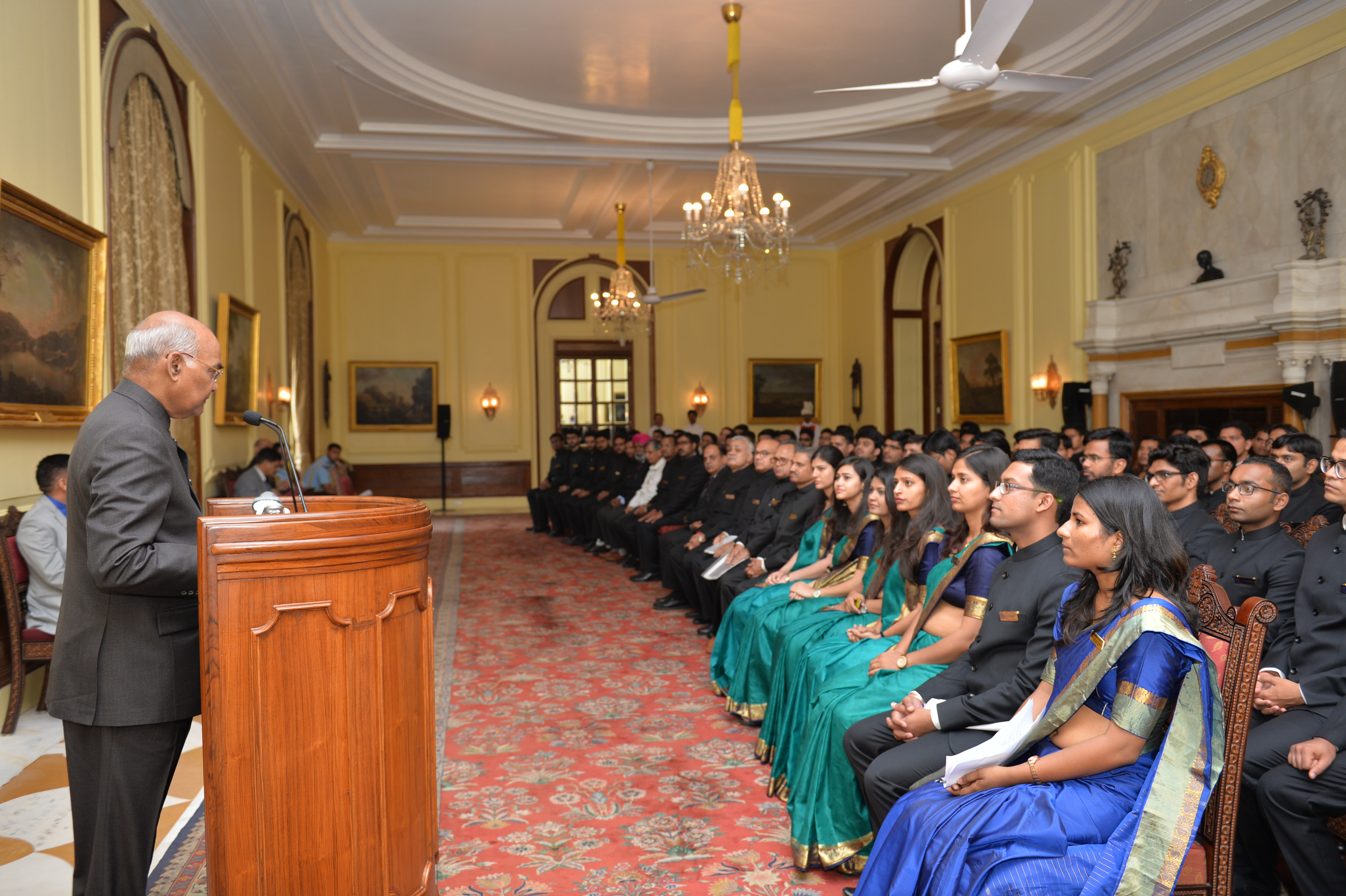
President of India interacting with CPWD Officers

2) CES (Central Engineering Services) for Civil Engineers

3) CEMES (Central Electrical and Mechanical Engineering Services) for Mechanical & Electrical Engineers

These are Group A Civil Services. (List of all Group A Civil Services: Civil Services of India)

Upon confirmation of service, a CPWD (CES and CEMES) officer through Engineering Services Exam serves as an Assistant Executive Engineer for a period of 4 years which include 52 weeks of Foundation Training at the National CPWD Academy, Ghaziabad. After selection through UPSC recruitment exam for Group A post in CAS cadre, the officers serve as Deputy Architect in CPWD. After the completion of 4 years, the officers are promoted to the grade of Executive Engineer/Architect which is equivalent to the Under Secretary to Government of India.

== Training ==
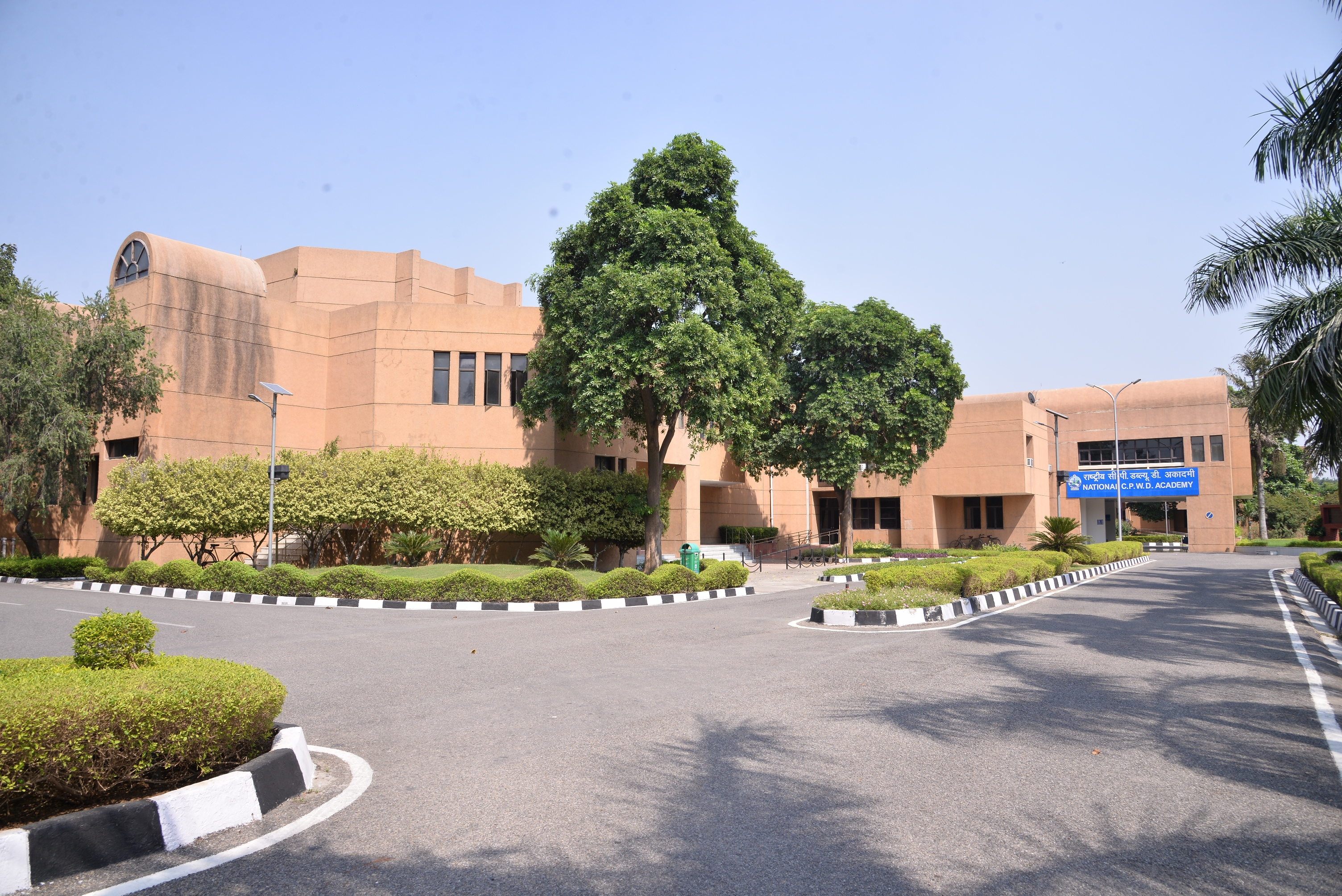
Academic block

National CPWD Academy is a Training Institute of Central Public Works Department (CPWD) which primarily focuses on the training needs of Group ‘A’ officers of CPWD via 52 weeks foundation course. Originally a training cell was set up in New Delhi in year 1965 for foundation training of Group ‘A’ officers. This training cell was developed into a full-fledged Training Institute at Ghaziabad which started functioning in 1995. The CPWD training Institute was renamed as National CPWD Academy in the year 2016.

The National CPWD Academy looks after the training needs of Engineers, Architects, Horticulturists all across the country. The main academy is located at Kamla Nehru Nagar, Hapur Road, Ghaziabad (U.P.). Regional Training Institutes are located in the four metros i.e. New Delhi, Mumbai, Kolkata and Chennai. The National CPWD Academy is located in Kamla Nehru Nagar, Ghaziabad nearly 6 km (3.7 mi). from Ghaziabad Railway Station, 30 km (19 mi). from New Delhi Railway Station and about 50 km (31 mi) from Indira Gandhi International Airport, New Delhi.

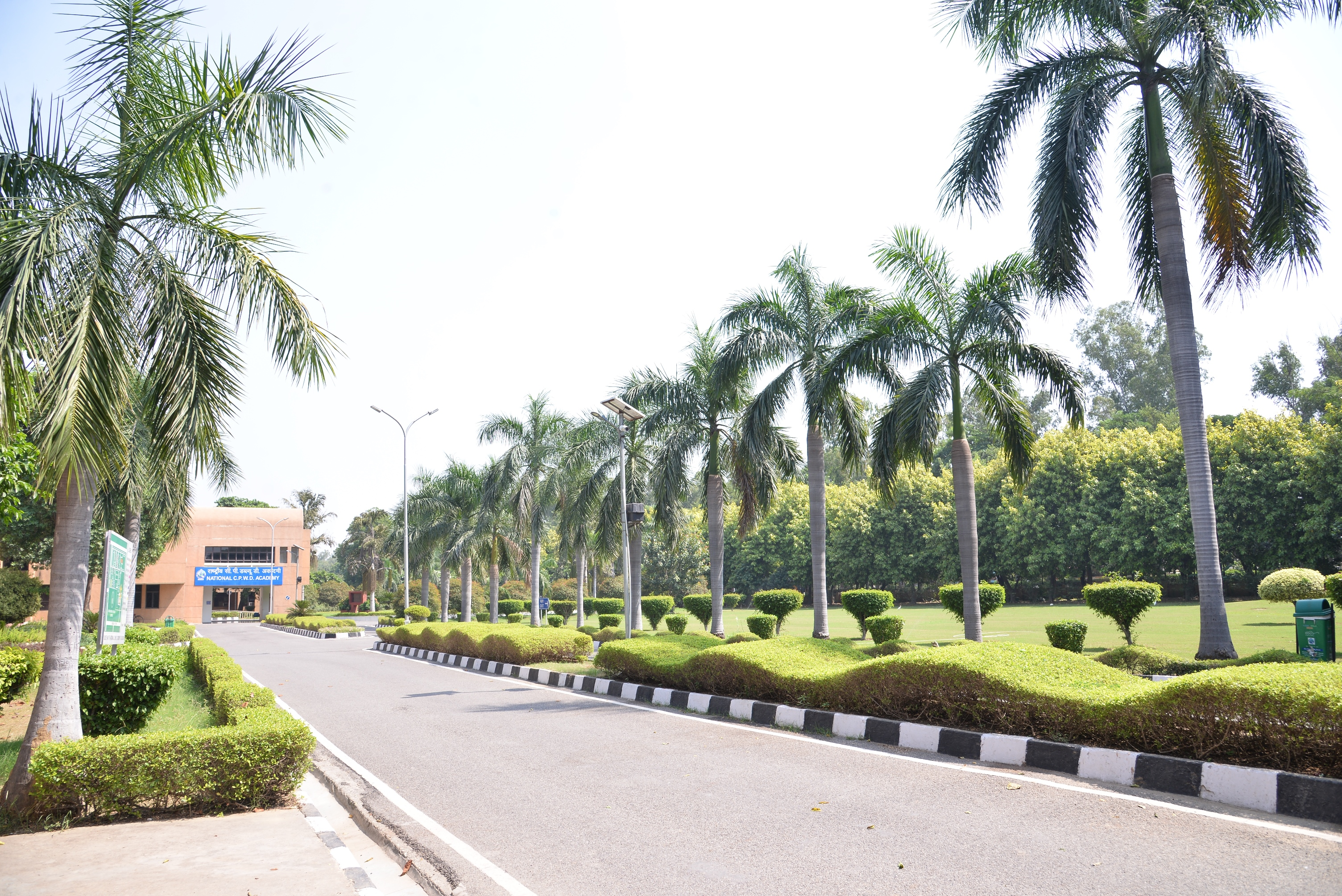
Campus road

The academy imparts training/refresher courses in all the aspects of public works. The academy conducts training programs, workshops, brain-storming sessions, seminars etc. to upgrade the techno-managerial skills of CPWD officers as well as officers of other Central Government Departments, State Governments and PSUs etc. The training programs are conducted in diverse streams such as Civil Engineering, Electrical and Mechanical Engineering, Architecture, IT Applications and Management Techniques. A number of new courses on Green Buildings, their rating system and certification, energy efficient buildings, conservation of heritage buildings etc. have been introduced to cater to the current changing construction scenario.

To cater the training needs of Group B & C officials of the department, four Regional Training Institutes are functioning at following locations:

1. Northern Region - R.K.Puram, New Delhi
2. Western Region - New Marine Lines, Mumbai
3. Eastern Region - Salt Lake City, Kolkata
4. Southern Region - Besant Nagar, Chennai

These institutes conduct training courses for Group B & C officials. Workers Training Centres at above locations are also part of Regional Training Institutes. Workers Training Centres impart skill improvement training to workers in various trades like mason, carpenter, plumber, Mali, electrician, wireman etc. (erstwhile Group D staff). The skill development courses for workers are also conducted in association with Construction Industry Development Council (CIDC). After completion of the training, certification of the workers is also done through IGNOU.

== Designations and career progression ==
The various posts held by CPWD Gazetted Officers directly recruited through Engineering Services Examination/ UPSC Architects Group 'A' Recruitment is given in the table below.

Positions and designations held by CPWD officers in their career
Position in the Government of India	Pay Scale 6th CPC (Pay Level 7th CPC)	Position in the Central Government
Director General (Apex Scale)	80000 (Pay Level 17)	Secretary
Special Director General	75500-80000 (Pay Level 16)	-
Additional Director General	67000-79000 (Pay Level 15)	Additional Secretary
Chief Engineer/Chief Architect	37400-67000 + 10000 Grade Pay (Pay Level 14)	Joint Secretary
Superintending Engineer/ Senior Architect	37400-67000 + 8700 Grade Pay (Pay Level 13)	Director
Executive Engineer (NFU)/ Architect (NFSG)	15600-39100 + 7600 Grade Pay (Pay Level 12)	Deputy Secretary
Executive Engineer/ Architect	15600-39100 + 6600 Grade Pay (Pay Level 11)	Under Secretary
Assistant Executive Engineer/ Deputy Architect (Entry Level)	15600-39100 + 5400 Grade Pay (Pay Level 10)	Assistant Secretary

== State Public Works Departments in India ==
- Karnataka Public Works Department
- Kerala Public Works Department
- Tamil Nadu Public Works Department
- Maharashtra Public Works Department
- Roads and Buildings Department, Gujarat
- Delhi Public Works Department
- Madhya Pradesh Public Works Department
- West Bengal Public Works Department
- Rajasthan Public Works Department
- Uttarakhand Public Works Department
- Uttar Pradesh Public Works Department
- Odisha Public Works Department
- Nagaland Public Works Department
- Assam Public Works Department
