= Bhubaneswar Bus Rapid Transit System =

Mass transportation system in Bhubaneswar, India

Bhubaneswar BRTS ଭୁବନେଶ୍ୱର BRTS

Overview
- Owner: Government of Odisha
- Locale: Bhubaneswar
- Transit type: Bus rapid transit
- Number of lines: 2 (Planned)
- Headquarters: Bhubaneswar, Odisha, India

Operation
- Operators: Bhubaneswar Municipal Corporation; Jawaharlal Nehru National Urban Renewal Mission (JNNURM)

Technical
- System length: 66.32 km (41.21 mi)

Bhubaneswar BRTS is proposed a bus rapid transit system for the city of Bhubaneswar. The Government of Odisha decided to introduce the much awaited bus rapid transit in the capital city, Bhubaneswar which will be designed by the Ahmedabad based Centre for Environmental Planning and Technology (CEPT). It has started running buses connecting some important localities to the airport and the railway station.

== Planning ==
For the detailed project report, the government asked the Ahmedabad based Centre for Environmental Planning and Technology (CEPT) to create the detailed project report (DPR) which was approved by the Central Government earlier. The Government of Odisha has sanctioned 460 crore for this BRTS project in Bhubaneswar under the Jawaharlal Nehru National Urban Renewal Mission (JNNURM). The decision was taken at a meeting of Central Sanctioning and Monitoring Committee (CSMC) of ministry of urban development in New Delhi. Bhubaneswar Development Authority Commissioner, Injeti Srinivas, at a high-level meeting recently, finalised this BRTS project and asked the Works Department of Odisha to go ahead with all the processes needed. The tendering process for the civil construction barricading two lane dedicated roads and bus stops are going on. The BRTS in Bhubaneswar was expected to be completed by the end of 2017.

== Phases ==
Route No	From	Via	To	Distance (in km)	Status
1	Biju Patnaik International Airport	Sishu Bhawan Square, Vani Vihar, Acharya Vihar, Sainik School and NALCO Square	Nandankanan Zoological Park	30.32	Planned
2	Kalpana Square	Kalinga Nagar, Rajmahal Square, Apollo Hospital and Rasulgarh	Mancheswar	36	Planned

== See also ==
- Bhubaneswar City Bus
- List of bus rapid transit systems
