= Uttarakhand Metro =

Rapid transit system in India serving Dehradun, Rishikesh and Haridwar

Overview
- Owner: Uttarakhand Metro Rail Corporation
- Area served: Dehradun, Rishikesh and Haridwar
- Locale: Uttarakhand, India
- Transit type: Light metro
- Number of lines: 2 (Proposed)
- Number of stations: 10 (Phase-1)
- Headquarters: SCI Tower, Haridwar Bypass Rd, opposite Mahindra Showroom, H. N. B. Colony, Ajabpur Kalan, Dehradun, Uttarakhand 248001
- Website: https://www.ukmrc.org/

Operation
- Operation will start: 2026
- Operator: Uttarakhand Metro Rail Corporation
- Character: Elevated & At-grade
- Train length: 3 coaches

Technical
- System length: 73 km (45 mi)
- Track gauge: 1,435 mm (4 ft 8 1/2 in) standard gauge
- Electrification: 750 V DC third rail overhead line
- Average speed: 25 km/h
- Top speed: 70 km/h

The Uttarakhand Metro is a light rapid transit system proposed for the city of Dehradun, India. The Unified Metropolitan Transport Authority (UMTA) approved 73 km long Dehradun–Rishikesh –Haridwar Metro Rail corridor in Uttarakhand in June 2020.The project will be executed by the Uttarakhand Metro Rail Corporation Limited (UKMRC), a special purpose vehicle and venture of the Government of Uttarakhand. The first phase, or Line-1, will be 32 km long with 10 stations, starting near the Jatwara Bridge in Jwalapur (western Haridwar), running parallel to the NH-34 Haridwar-Rishikesh highway, and ending at Rishikesh’s Chandrabhaga Bridge. The second phase, or Line-2, will be 41 km long, following National Highway-7 from Nepali Farm to Dehradun’s Inter-State Bus Terminal (ISBT) via the Vidhan Sabha. The estimated cost of the project would be ₹ 40,150 crore.

== Network ==
The Dehradun-Rishikesh-Hardiwar Metro project is a 73 km long metro corridor that will be developed in two phases: Phase 1 involves a 32 km metro line from Haridwar to Rishikesh, featuring ten stations, and starting near the Jatwara Bridge in Jwalapur (western Haridwar), running parallel to the NH-34 Haridwar-Rishikesh highway, and ending at Rishikesh’s Chandrabhaga Bridge. Phase 2 covers a 41 km route with a 10 km metro track within Dehradun city, and following National Highway-7 from Nepali Farm to Dehradun’s Inter-State Bus Terminal (ISBT) via the Vidhan Sabha.

== See also ==
- Char Dham Railway
- Rishikesh–Karnaprayag Railway
- Urban rail transit in India
- Kolkata Metro
- Delhi Metro
