= Ministry of Housing and Urban Affairs =

Government ministry of India

- Branch of Government of India

- Ministry of Housing and Urban Affairs

Ministry overview
- Formed: 1952; 74 years ago
- Jurisdiction: Government of India
- Headquarters: Nirman Bhawan, New Delhi
- Annual budget: ₹85,552 crore (US$8.9 billion) (2026–27 est)
- Ministers responsible: Manohar Lal Khattar, Cabinet Minister; Tokhan Sahu, Minister of State
- Ministry executives: Satendra Singh, IAS, Secretary (Housing and Urban Affairs); D Thara, Secretary (Department of Capital Development)
- Website: mohua.gov.in

The Ministry of Housing and Urban Affairs (MoHUA) is a ministry of the Government of India. It deals with and has authority over the formulation and administration of the rules and regulations, and laws relating to housing and urban development in India. The Ministry became independent from the Ministry of Housing and Urban Poverty Alleviation in 2004, but was later re-merged with it in 2017.In July 2026, the Department of Capital Development was carved out and is designed to streamline operations specific to the National Capital Region (India). It decouples local capital governance from broader national urban policy initiatives.

It is the Cadre Controlling Authority (CCA) of the three cadres in CPWD:

1) Central Architects Services (CAS)

2) Central Engineering Services (CES)

3) Central Electrical and Mechanical Engineering Services (CEMES)

These are Group A Civil Services.

== Organisation ==
=== Divisions ===
- Administration
- Atal Mission for Rejuvenation and Urban Transformation (AMRUT)
- Budget
- Coordination, Public Grievances Parliament
- Delhi
- Economic
- Finance
- Local Self Government(LSG)
- National Urban Renewal Mission (NURM)
- Public Health Engineering (PHE)
- Printing and Stationary Publication (PSP)
- Smart Cities
- Swachh Bharat Mission
- Urban Development
- Urban Transport
- Vigilance
- Works
- Housing
- Housing for All
- DAY-NULM (National Urban Livelihoods Mission)

=== Attached Offices ===
- Central Public Works Department (CPWD)
- Directorate of Estates
- Directorate of Printing
- Land & Development Office
- National Buildings Organisation (NBO)

=== Subordinate Offices ===
- Town & Country Planning Organisation
- Government of India Stationery Office
- Department of Publication

=== Statutory Bodies ===
- Delhi Urban Arts Commission
- National Capital Region Planning Board
- Rajghat Samadhi Committee
- Delhi Development Authority (DDA)
- Central Government Employees Welfare Housing Organisation (CGEWHO)
- National Cooperative Housing Federation of India (NCHFI)

=== Autonomous Bodies ===
- Regional Centre for Urban and Environmental Studies (RCUES) in Lucknow, Hyderabad, Mumbai
- Building Materials and Technology Promotion Council (BMTPC)
- National Institute of Urban Affairs

=== Central Public Sector Undertakings ===
- NBCC (India) Limited
- Housing and Urban Development Corporation Limited
- Hindustan Prefab Limited
- National Capital Region Transport Corporation
- Urban Mass Transit Company (UMTC)

=== Schemes ===
- Smart Cities Mission
- HRIDAY
- AMRUT
- Urban Transport
- Swachh Bharat Mission
- Deendayal Antyodaya Yojana-National Urban Livelihoods Mission (DAY-NULM)
- PM Street Vendor's AtmaNirbhar Nidhi (PM SVANidhi)

=== Joint ventures ===
- Delhi Metro
- Chennai Metro
- Kolkata Metro
- Bangalore Metro
- Rapid Metro Gurgaon
- Jaipur Metro
- Mumbai Metro
- Lucknow Metro
- Kochi Metro
- Noida Metro
- Navi Mumbai Metro
- Mumbai Monorail
- Nagpur Metro
- Ahmedabad Metro

== See also ==
- Minister of Housing and Urban Affairs
- Ministry of Housing and Urban Poverty Alleviation
