= List of bus rapid transit systems in Asia and the Pacific =

The term bus rapid transit system (BRT system) has been applied to a wide range of bus, trolleybus, and electric bus systems. In 2012, the Institute for Transportation and Development Policy (ITDP) published a BRT Standard to make it easier to standardize and compare bus services.

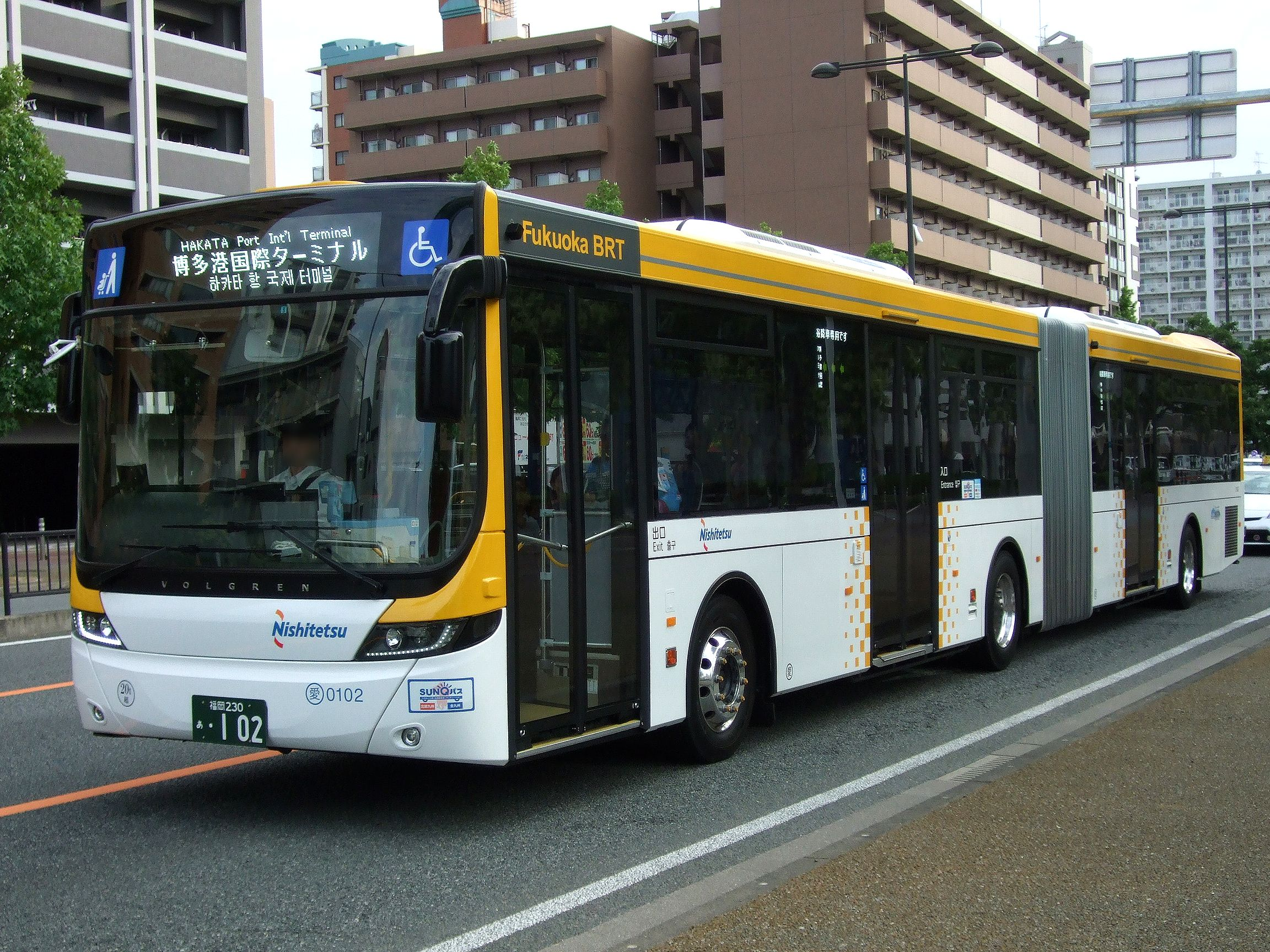
Nishitetsu bus Fukuoka, Fukuoka BRT

The below list only includes BRT systems in Asia and the Pacific that are in operation or under construction.

== Legend ==
Status (background color)

- White: Operational
- Light blue: Under construction

City
Primary city served by the buses and trolleybus.
System name
The English name of the bus rapid transit or overview article for city.
Operator
Operating the main bus services along its designated route.
Began
The year that the bus rapid transit began operating for passenger service.
Stations
Stations connected by transfers are counted as one station, unless otherwise note.
Length (km)
Track length; lines which share track are counted once or Corridor length; lines which sharing the same corridor are counted once.
Notes/Description
A short objective description and subjective of routes bus rapid transit ridership and passengers (daily).
Type
eBRT - Electric Bus Rapid Transit, using Trolleybuses or eBRT using Electric buses or other source.
BRT certified
ITDP standards-and-guides and bus-rapid-transit-standard year rewards.

=== Afghanistan ===
BRT systems in Afghanistan
City	System name	Began	Lines	Stations	Length	Notes/Description	Type	BRT certified
Kabul	Kabul BRT (Metrobus)	-	4	-	111 km (69 mi)			Not BRT certified in 2022.

=== Azerbaijan ===
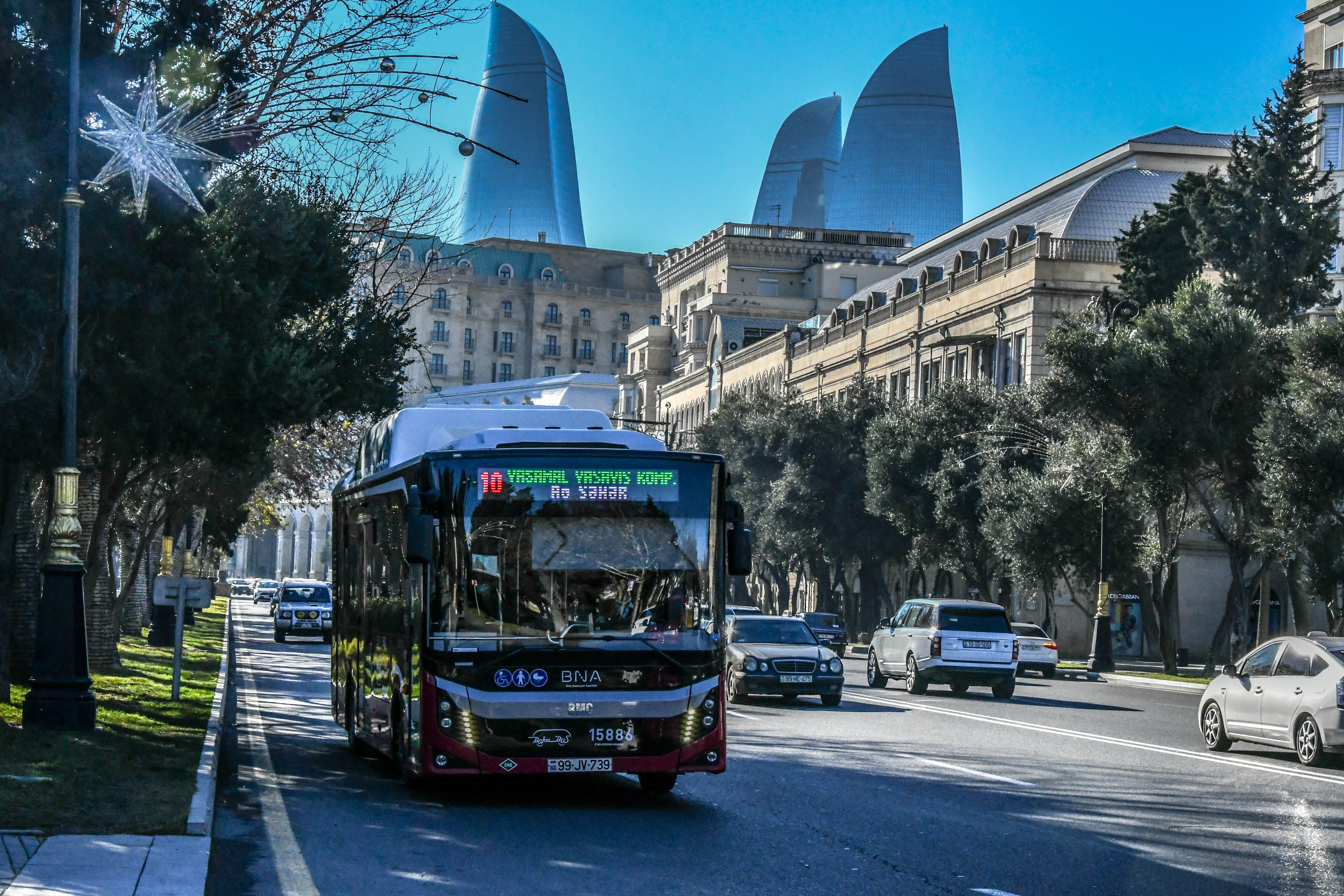
Baku Bus in Baku

BRT systems in Azerbaijan
City	System name	Operator	Began	Lines	Stations	Length	Notes/Description	Type	BRT certified
Baku	BakuBus	BakuBus LLC	3 April 2014	5	-	-			Not BRT certified in 2022.

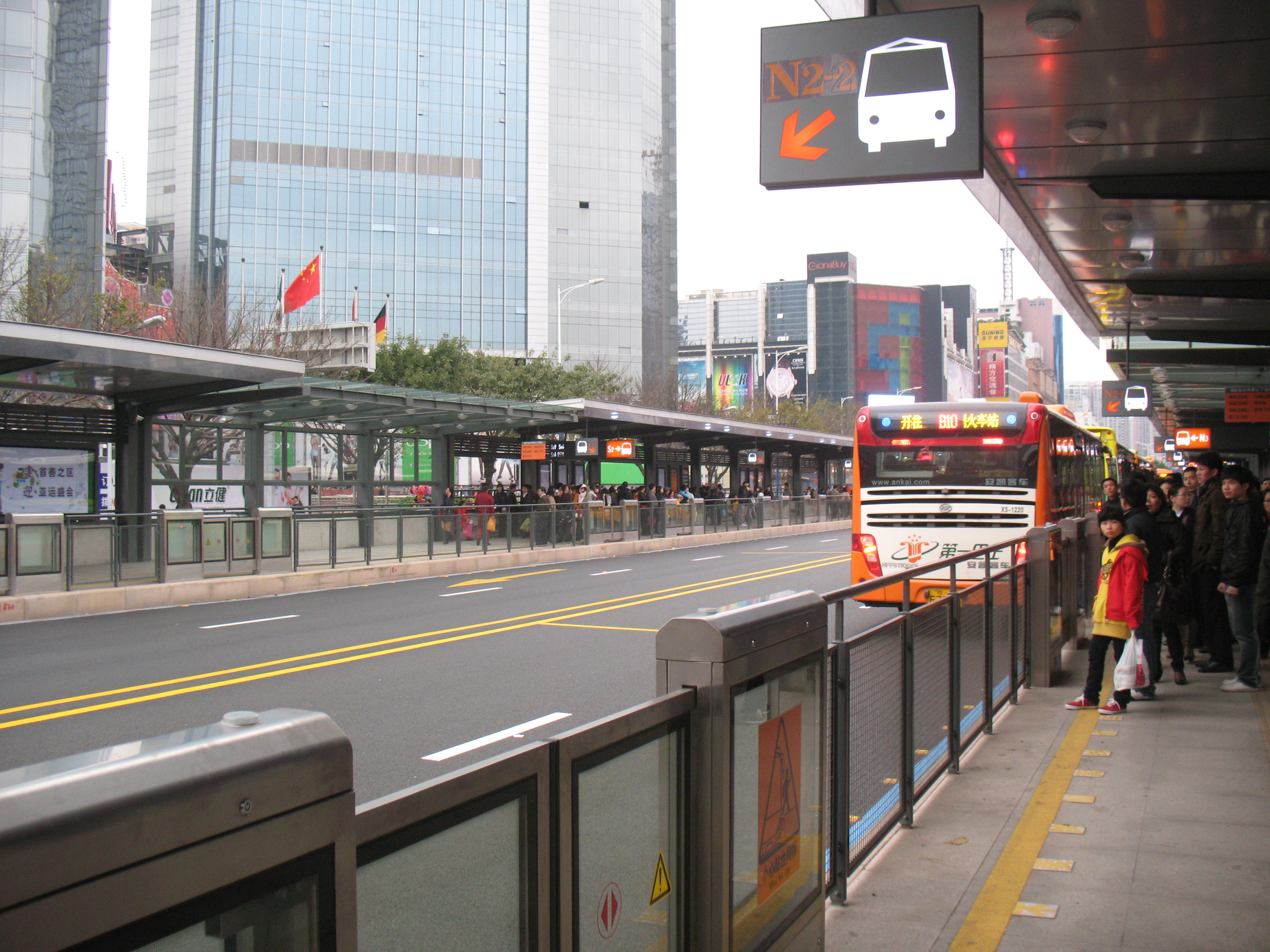
Guangzhou BRT

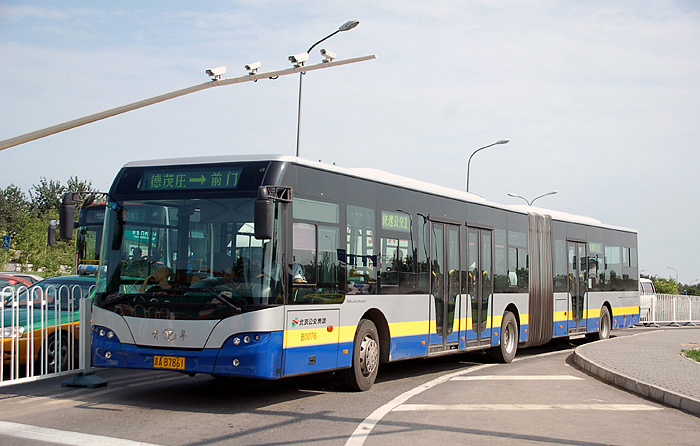
Beijing BRT Line 1; the doors are on the left side because the line uses center-island platforms on most of its route.

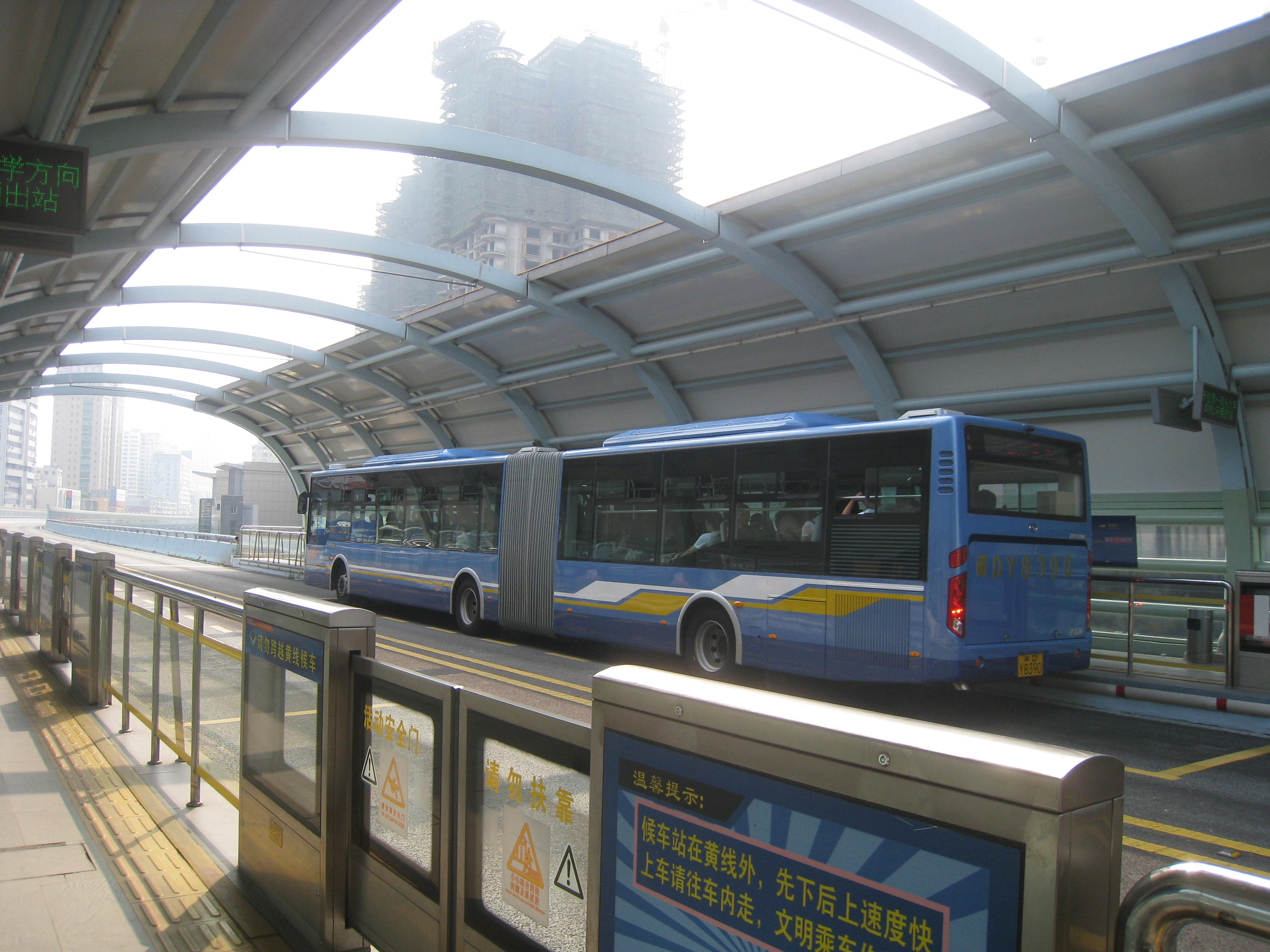
Xiamen BRT

More than 30 projects are being implemented or studied in China's large cities. In the following table, BRT systems in light blue are under construction. Kunming developed the country's first BRT system in 1999.

BRT systems in China
City	System name	Chinese name	Began	Lines	Stations (Note: Stations connected by transfers are counted as one station, unless otherwise noted.)	Length (Note: Corridor length; lines which sharing the same corridor are counted once.)	Notes/Description	Type	BRT certified
Hangzhou	Hangzhou BRT	杭州BRT	2006	2	50	55.4 km (34.4 mi)			Not BRT certified in 2014.
Beijing	Beijing BRT	北京BRT	2004	4	78	79.96 km (49.68 mi)			Bronze BRT certified (2013).
Beijing	Beijing Bus Rapid Transit Line 1	北京BRT	2 January 2016	1	17	15.51 km (9.64 mi)		eBRT trolleybuses	Bronze BRT certified (2013).
Beijing	Beijing Bus Rapid Transit Line 2	北京BRT	2017	1	20	16 km (9.9 mi)			Bronze BRT certified (2013).
Beijing	Beijing Bus Rapid Transit Line 3	北京BRT	15 January 2015	1	22	22.95 km (14.26 mi)		eBRT trolleybuses	Bronze BRT certified (2013).
Beijing	Beijing Bus Rapid Transit Line 4	北京BRT	30 December 2012	1	19	25.5 km (15.8 mi)			Bronze BRT certified (2013).
Kunming	Kunming BRT	昆明BRT	1999	5	63	56 km (35 mi)			Not BRT certified in 2013.
Changzhou	Changzhou BRT	常州BRT	2008	2	51	44 km (27 mi)			Bronze BRT certified (2013).
Xiamen	Xiamen BRT	厦门BRT	2008	3	31	67.4 km (41.9 mi)	(Note: Portions (BRT 1 33.4 km, BRT 1 Interchange 18.7 km and BRT 2 15.3 km) are on dedicated, elevated roads.)		Sliver BRT certified (2014).
Jinan	Jinan BRT	济南BRT	2008	6	46	56 km (35 mi)	(Note: Portions (B7 Xierhuan corridor 7.1 km, Beiyuan Dajie 15.0 km, Erhuandonglu 8.0 km, Lishan Lu 4.8 km, Gongyebeilu-Aotizonglu Line 6 6.6 km) are on dedicated, six line on corridor.)		Bronze BRT certified (2013 & 2014).
Zaozhuang	Zaozhuang BRT B1	枣庄BRT	2010	1	49	33.5 km (20.8 mi)			Bronze BRT certified (2014).
Zaozhuang	Zaozhuang BRT B3	枣庄BRT	-	1	-	32.2 km (20.0 mi)			Basic BRT certified (2014).
Zaozhuang	Zaozhuang BRT B5	枣庄BRT	-	1	-	18.5 km (11.5 mi)			Basic BRT certified (2014).
Zhengzhou	Zhengzhou BRT	郑州BRT	28 May 2009	5	97	70.3 km (43.7 mi)			Bronze BRT certified (2014).
Zhengzhou	Zhengzhou BRT Route B2	郑州BRT	1 January 2021	2	17	12.5 km (7.8 mi)		eBRT trolleybuses	Bronze BRT certified (2014).
Guangzhou	Guangzhou BRT	广州BRT	2010	1	26	22.5 km (14.0 mi)			Gold BRT certified (2013).
Suzhou	Suzhou BRT	苏州BRT	2008	5	106	95 km (59 mi)			Not BRT certified in 2014.
Dalian	Dalian BRT	大连BRT	2008	1	13	13 km (8.1 mi)			Basic BRT certified (2014).
Hefei	Hefei BRT	合肥BRT	2010	4	43	42 km (26 mi)			Basic BRT certified in (2014).
Yancheng	Yancheng BRT	盐城BRT	2010	2	33	33 km (21 mi)			Bronze BRT certified (2014).
Ürümqi	Ürümqi BRT	乌鲁木齐BRT	2011	4	66	42.2 km (26.2 mi)			Bronze BRT certified (2014).
Changde	Changde BRT	常德BRT	2012	1	25	20.9 km (13.0 mi)			Basic BRT certified (2014).
Lianyungang	Lianyungang BRT	连云港BRT	2012	1	29	34 km (21 mi)			Bronze BRT certified (2014).
Lanzhou	Lanzhou BRT	兰州BRT	2012	1	15	9.1 km (5.7 mi)			Sliver BRT certified (2013).
Yinchuan	Yinchuan BRT	银川BRT	2012	1	22	21.2 km (13.2 mi)			Bronze BRT certified (2014).
Chengdu	Chengdu BRT	成都BRT	2013	4	29	28.3 km (17.6 mi)			Sliver BRT certified (2014).
Zhongshan	Zhongshan BRT	中山BRT	2014	1	13	13 km (8.1 mi)			Bronze BRT certified (2014).
Yichang	Yichang BRT	宜昌BRT	2015	1	22	23 km (14 mi)			Gold BRT certified (2014).
Wenzhou	Wenzhou BRT	温州BRT	2015	1	17	13 km (8.1 mi)			Not BRT certified in 2022.
Wuhan	Wuhan BRT	武汉BRT	2016	1	14	13.6 km (8.5 mi)			Not BRT certified in 2022.
Shanghai	Yan'an Road Medium Capacity Bus Transit System	延安路中运量公交	1 February 2017	1	25	17.5 km (10.9 mi)		eBRT trolleybuses	Not BRT certified in 2022.
Shanghai	Fengpu Express	奉浦快线	2018	1	12	20.3 km (12.6 mi)			Not BRT certified in 2014.
Guiyang	Guiyang BRT	贵阳BRT	2017	1	24	29 km (18 mi)			Not BRT certified in 2022.
Yiwu	Yiwu BRT	义乌 BRT	2017	1	17	12.1 km (7.5 mi)			Not BRT certified in 2022.
Linyi	Linyi BRT	临沂 BRT	2017	1	14	12.3 km (7.6 mi)			Not BRT certified in 2014.
Nanning	Nanning BRT	南宁BRT	2017	2	33	27 km (17 mi)			Not BRT certified in 2014.
Fuzhou (Jiangxi)	Fuzhou BRT	抚州BRT	2019	1	18	18.5 km (11.5 mi)			Not BRT certified in 2022.
Zigong	Zigong BRT	自贡BRT	2021 June	1	-	-			Not BRT certified in 2022.
Shenzhen	Shenzhen BRT	深圳BRT	-	-	-	-			
Wuxi	Wuxi BRT	无锡BRT	-	-	-	-			
Xi'an	Xi'an BRT	西安BRT	-	-	-	-			
Shenyang	Shenyang BRT	沈阳BRT	-	-	-	-			
Shijiazhuang	Shijiazhuang BRT	石家庄BRT	-	-	-	-			
Harbin	Harbin BRT	哈尔滨BRT	-	-	-	-			

=== Georgia ===
BRT systems in Georgia
City	System name	Operator	Began	Lines	Stations	Length	Notes/Description	Type	BRT certified
Tbilisi	-	-	-	-	-	-	Vake district and Ilia Chavchavadze Avenue pilot BRT project, completed in 2020-2022.		

=== India ===
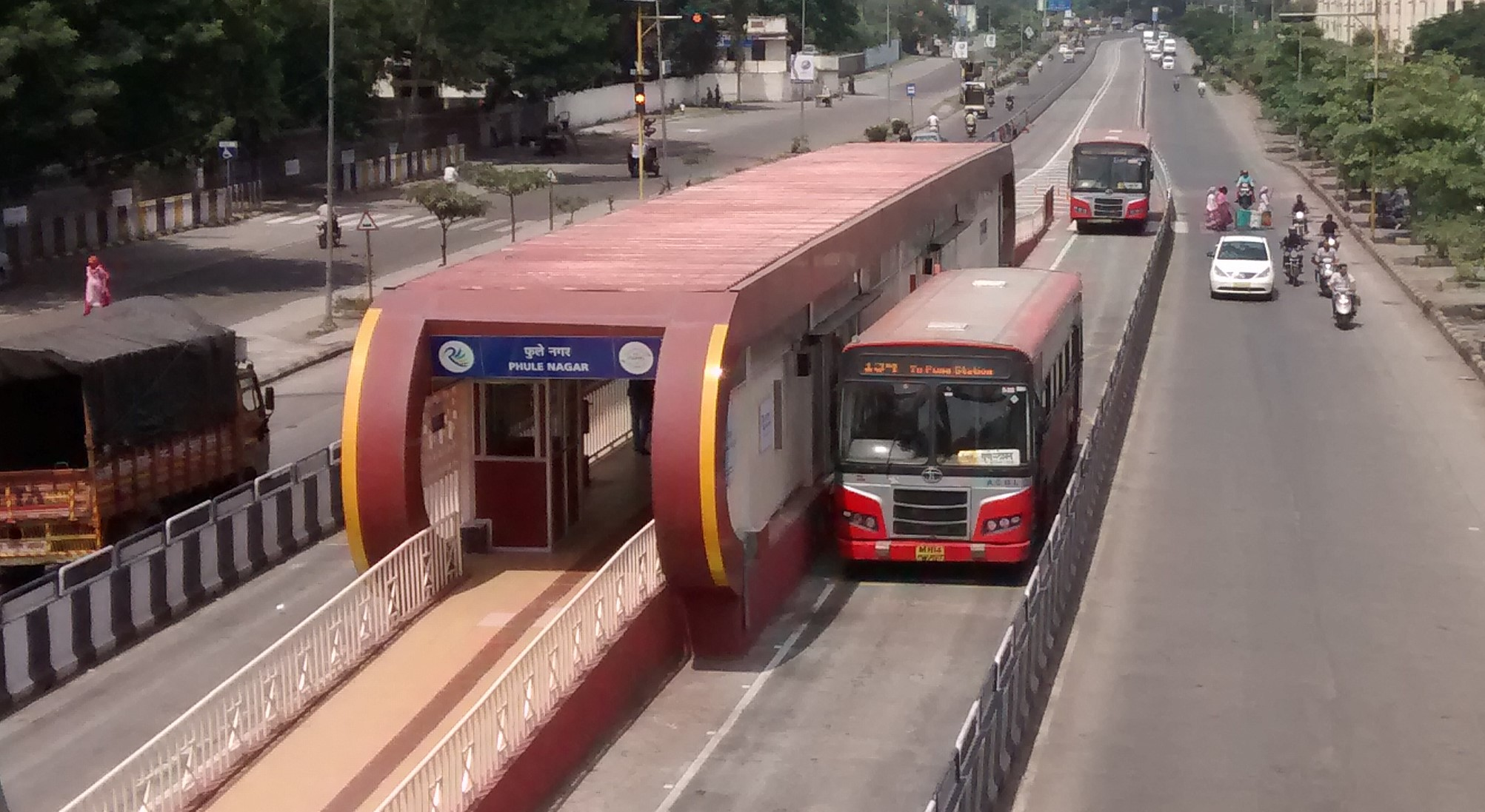
Pune BRTS

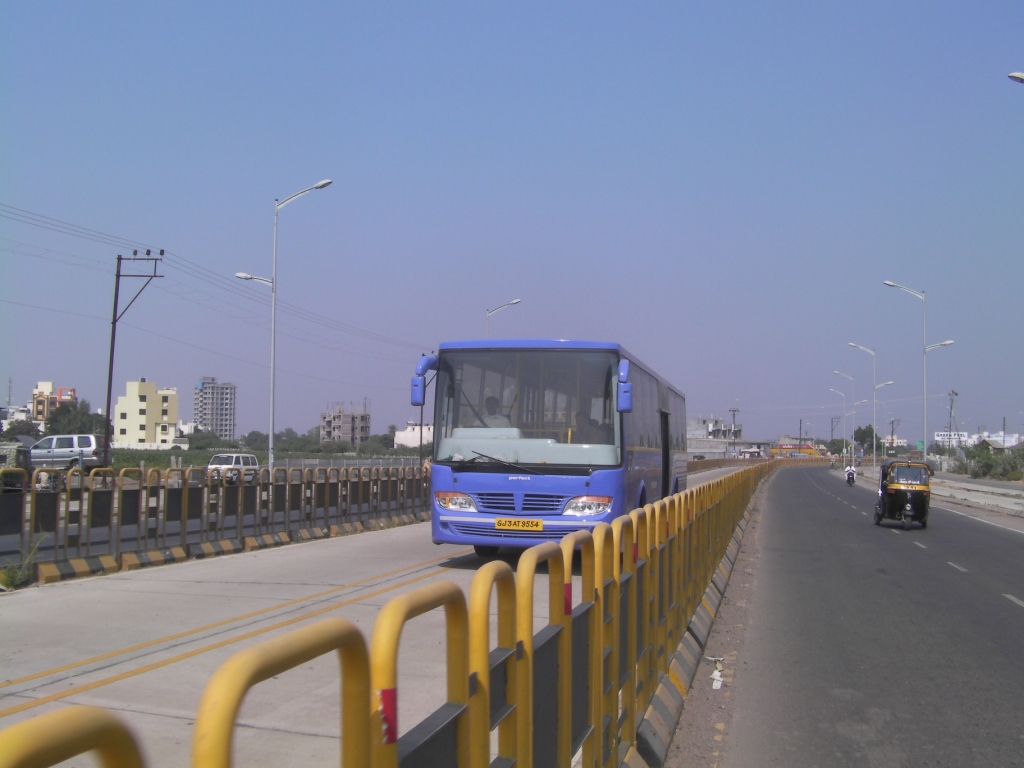
Rajkot BRTS

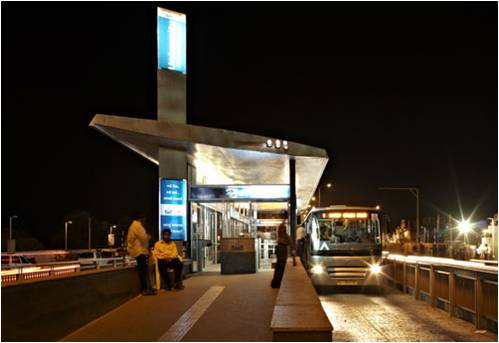
Ahmedabad BRTS

Government-designated BRT systems (BRTS) with segregated lanes: India is rapidly building new BRTS systems around the country. Several systems are operational while many are under construction and are also proposed.

In the following table, BRT systems in light blue are under construction.

BRT systems in India
City	System name	Native name	Acronym	Began	Lines	Stations (Note: Stations connected by transfers are counted as one station, unless otherwise noted.)	Length (Note: Track length; lines which share track are counted once.)	Notes/Description	Type	BRT certified
Pune	Rainbow BRTS	रेनबो जलद बस परिवहन	PNBRTS	2006	6	102	114 km (71 mi)			Basic BRT certified (2016).
Ahmedabad	Ahmedabad BRTS	અમદાવાદ BRT	AHMDBRTS	2009	14	150	89 km (55 mi)			1 Silver + 2 Bronze BRT certified (2013 & 2014).
Ahmedabad	Ahmedabad BRTS	અમદાવાદ BRT	Janmarg - RTO-Maninagar	-	-	-	21.5 km (13.4 mi)			Bronze BRT certified (2013).
Ahmedabad	Ahmedabad BRTS	અમદાવાદ BRT	Janmarg - Narol-Naroda	-	-	-	13.2 km (8.2 mi)			Silver BRT certified (2013).
Ahmedabad	Ahmedabad BRTS	અમદાવાદ BRT	Janmarg - Sola-AEC	-	-	-	3.1 km (1.9 mi)			Bronze BRT certified (2014).
Indore	Indore BRTS	इंदौर BRTS	INDBRTS	2013	10	21	126.46 km (78.58 mi)			Bronze BRT certified (2016).
Rajkot	Rajkot BRTS	રાજકોટ BRT	RAJBRTS	2008	1	18	10.5 km (6.5 mi)			Not BRT certified in 2013.
Surat	Surat BRTS	સુરત BRT	SURBRTS	2013	15	148	114 km (71 mi)			Bronze BRT certified (2014).
Bhopal	Bhopal BRTS	भोपाल BRTS	BHPBRTS	2006	10	230	186 km (116 mi)	The process of dismantling the corridor began on 20 January 2024 the line is close		Not BRT certified in 2013.
Jaipur	Jaipur BRTS	जयपुर BRTS	JAIBRTS	2010	1	10	7.1 km (4.4 mi)			Not BRT certified in 2014.
Mumbai	Mumbai BRTS	मुंबई जलद बस परिवहन	Planned	-	1(Planned)	-	-			
Bhubaneswar	Bhubaneswar BRTS	ଭୁବନେଶ୍ୱର BRTS	Planned	2019	2(Planned)	-	-			
Hyderabad	Hyderabad BRTS	హైదరాబాద్ BRTS	SZBRT	Planned	2(Planned)	-	-			
Vijayawada	Vijayawada BRTS	విజయవాడ BRT	VJWDABRTS	-	6	-	-			
Hubli–Dharwad	Hubli–Dharwad BRTS	ಚಿಗರಿ	HDBRTS	1 November 2018	6	33	70 km (43 mi)			Not BRT certified in 2022.
Raipur-Naya Raipur	Raipur and Naya Raipur BRTS	रायपुर-नया रायपुर BRTS	-	2016	2	10	40 km (25 mi)			Not BRT certified in 2022.
Visakhapatnam	Visakhapatnam BRTS	విశాఖపట్నం BRTS	-	2016	2	-	42 km (26 mi)			Not BRT certified in 2022.

=== Indonesia ===
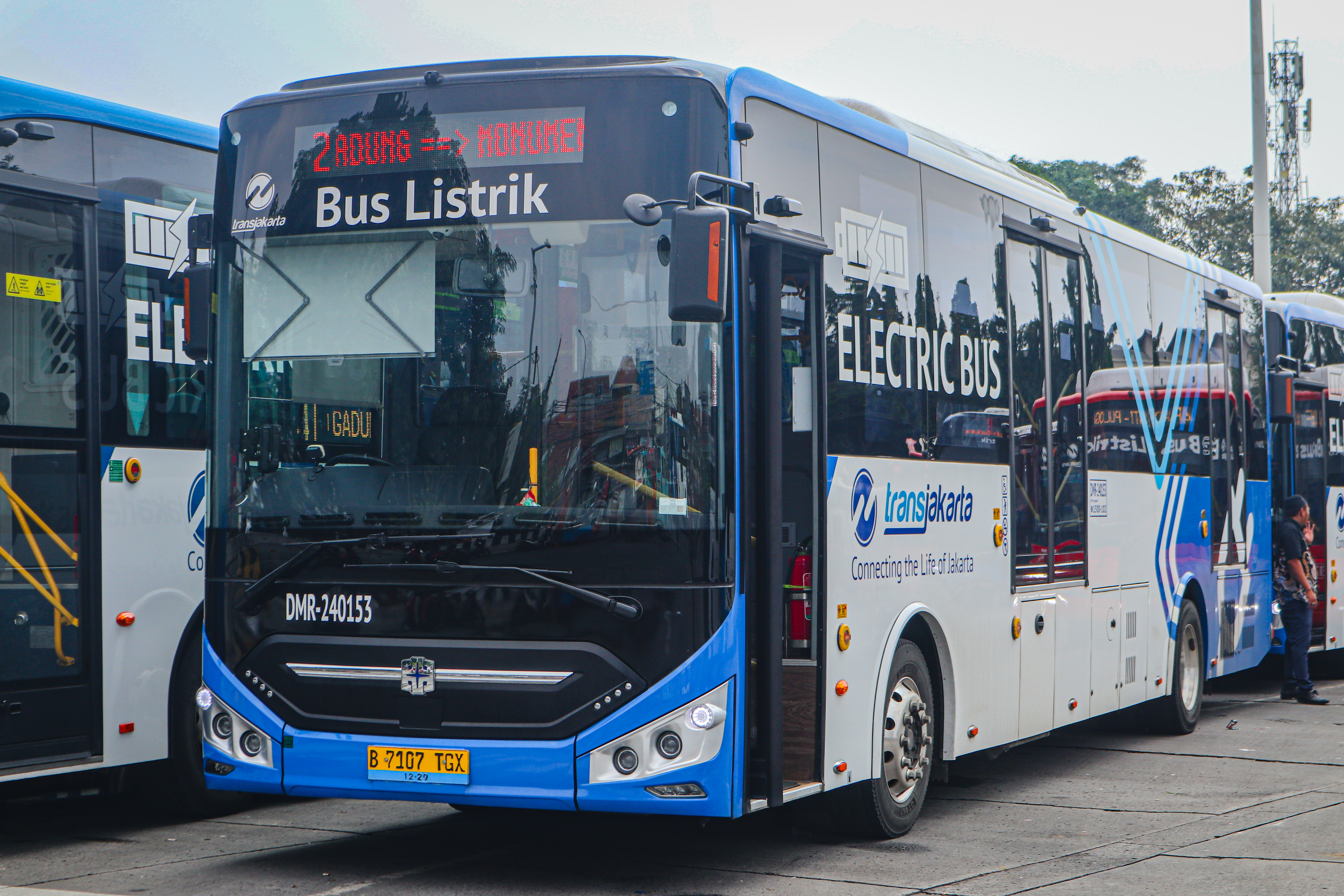
Transjakarta Zhongtong LCK6126EVGRA2 serving Corridor 2 in Jakarta

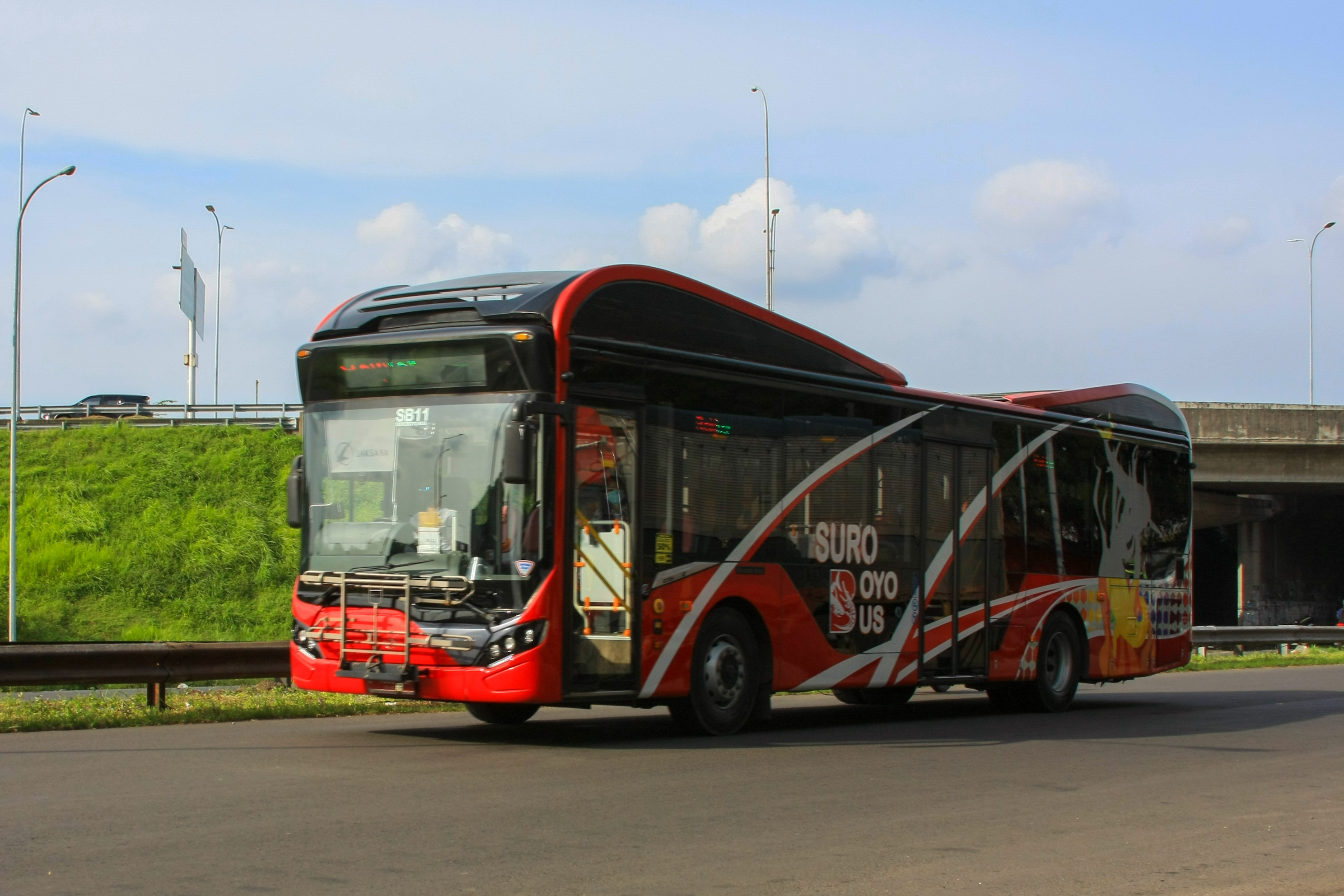
Suroboyo Bus Mercedes-Benz O500U 1726 LE serving Corridor R1 in Surabaya

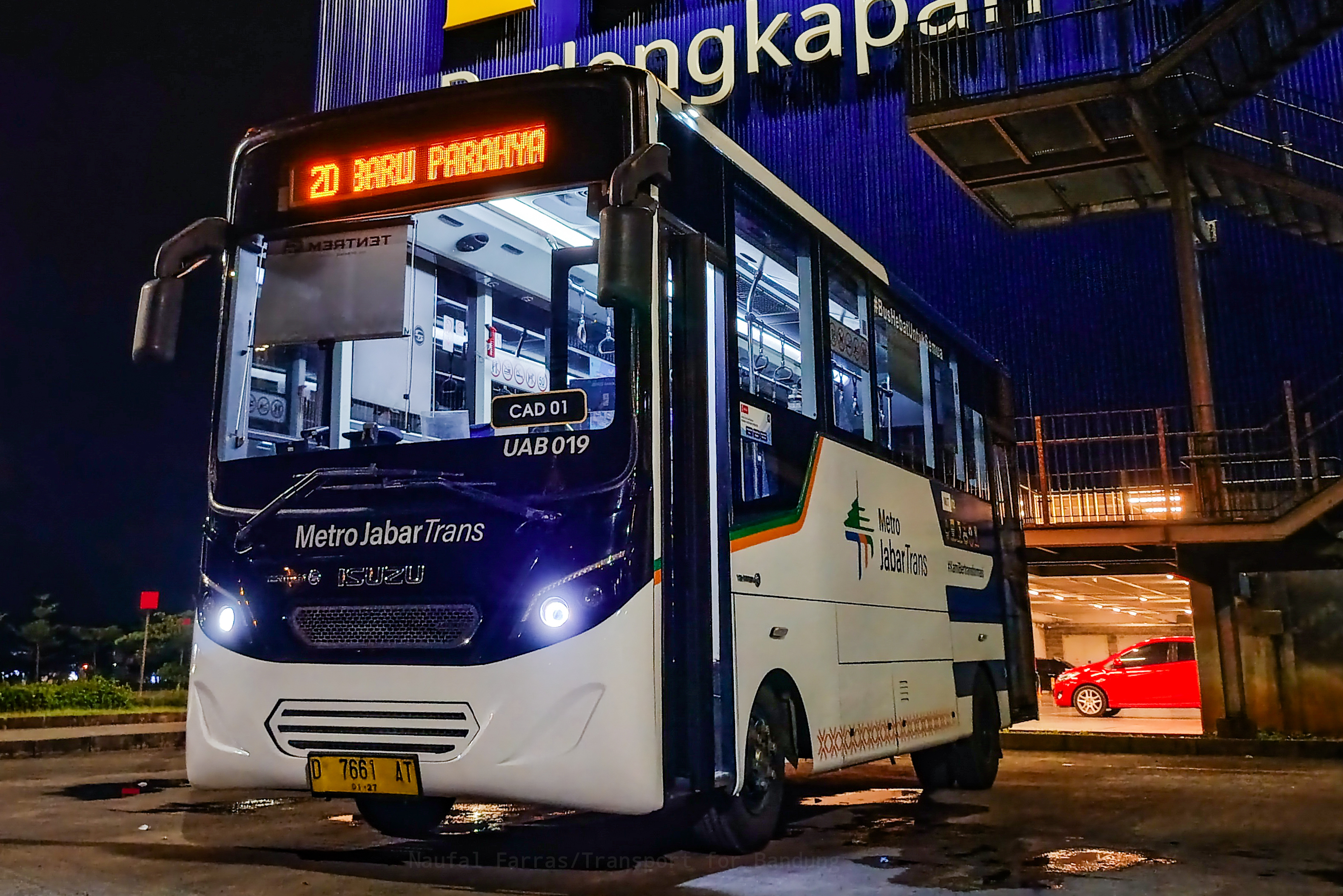
Metro Jabar Trans Isuzu ELF NQR 71 serving Corridor 2D in Bandung

BRT systems in Indonesia
City	System name	Began	Lines	Stations (Note: Stations connected by transfers are counted as one station, unless otherwise noted.)	Length (Note: Corridor length; lines which sharing the same corridor are counted once.)	Passengers (daily)	Notes/Description	Type	BRT certified
Bali	Trans Metro Dewata	7 September 2020	6	381	264.8 km	5,374	Commenced operations again on 20 April 2025.		Not BRT certified in 2014.
Balikpapan	Balikpapan City Trans	8 July 2024	3	-	-	-			Not BRT certified in 2024.
Banjarmasin metropolitan area	BRT Banjarbakula	14 August 2019	3	37	-	-			Not BRT certified in 2022.
Banjarmasin metropolitan area	Trans Banjarbakula	1 February 2022	4	-	-	6,000			Not BRT certified in 2022.
Banjarmasin metropolitan area	Trans Banjarmasin	17 February 2020	4	-	-	-			Not BRT certified in 2022.
Banyumas Regency	Trans Banyumas	5 December 2021	4	-	-	-			Not BRT certified in 2022.
Bekasi City	BisKita Trans Bekasi Patriot	3 March 2024	1	47	-	-			Not BRT certified in 2024.
Bekasi Regency	BisKita Trans Wibawa Mukti	1 December 2024	1	58	-	-			Not BRT certified in 2024.
Bogor	BisKita Trans Pakuan	2 December 2021	4	120	-	-			Not BRT certified in 2022.
Central Java	Trans Jateng	7 July 2017	4	-	-	6,506,462			Not BRT certified in 2022.
Cirebon	BRT Trans Cirebon	-	-	-	-	-			
Depok	Trans Depok	1 July 2024	1	50	-	-			Not BRT certified in 2024.
East Java	Trans Jatim	19 August 2022	5	-	75 km (47 mi)	-			Not BRT certified in 2022.
Jakarta	Transjakarta	15 January 2004	13	244	264.6 km (164.4 mi)	1,006,579	Transjakarta is the longest BRT network in the world (251.2 km), carries more than 1 million passengers daily with a fleet of over 3,900 buses. Despite being branded as BRT systems, practically all bus networks in Indonesia except for Transjakarta does not have right of way.		Sliver BRT certified (2014).
Jayapura	Trans Jayapura	18 December 2019	4	4	-	-			Not BRT certified in 2022.
Batam	Trans Batam	24 September 2004	8	39	-	-			Not BRT certified in 2014.
Yogyakarta	Trans Jogja	17 February 2008	11	267	-	20,000			Not BRT certified in 2014.
Pekanbaru	Trans Metro Pekanbaru	18 June 2009	10	80	-	-			Not BRT certified in 2014.
Bandung metropolitan area	Trans Metro Bandung	23 September 2009	5	52	-	-			Not BRT certified in 2014.
Bandung metropolitan area	Metro Jabar Trans	21 December 2021	6	191	-	-			Not BRT certified in 2022.
Palembang	Trans Musi Jaya	January 2010	6	129	156 km (97 mi)	22,000			Not BRT certified in 2014.
Surakarta	Batik Solo Trans	1 September 2010	8	72	-	10,000			Not BRT certified in 2014.
Semarang	Trans Semarang	1 October 2010	8	35	-	33,000			Not BRT certified in 2014.
Denpasar metropolitan area	Trans Sarbagita	18 August 2011	4	31	42 km (26 mi)	5,000			Not BRT certified in 2014.
Bandar Lampung	Trans Bandar Lampung	14 November 2011	3	30	-	-			Not BRT certified in 2014.
Padang	Trans Padang	January 2014	2	26	42 km (26 mi)	10,000			Not BRT certified in 2014.
Palangka Raya	Trans Palangka Raya	2 February 2018	5	26	-	-			Not BRT certified in 2022.
Palu	Trans Palu	1 October 2024	4	-	-	-			Not BRT certified in 2024.
Pontianak	Trans Pontianak Khatulistiwa	3 February 2017	1	-	-	-			Not BRT certified in 2022.
Makassar metropolitan area	Trans Mamminasata	March 2014	11	154	-	-			Not BRT certified in 2014.
Banda Aceh	Trans Koetaradja	2 May 2016	5	90	-	15,342			Not BRT certified in 2022.
Surabaya metropolitan area	Suroboyo Bus	7 April 2018	9	-	-	4,432			Not BRT certified in 2022.
Surabaya metropolitan area	Trans Semanggi Suroboyo	29 December 2021	2	-	-	-			Not BRT certified in 2022.
Medan metropolitan area	Trans Mebidang	2015	2	-	55 km (34 mi)	-			Not BRT certified in 2016.
Medan metropolitan area	Trans Metro Deli	22 November 2020	5	-	-	-			Not BRT certified in 2022.
Medan metropolitan area	Bus Listrik Medan	4 January 2024	5	31	10.5 km (6.5 mi)	-		eBRT electric buses	Not BRT certified in 2024.

=== Iran ===
BRT systems in Iran
City	System name	Began	Lines	Stations	Length	Notes/Description	Type	BRT certified
Tehran	Tehran BRT	2008	10	-	179 km (111 mi)			Not BRT certified in 2022.
Tabriz	Tabriz BRT	2009	2	-	18 km (11 mi)			Not BRT certified in 2022.
Shiraz	Shiraz BRT	-	4	-	-			Not BRT certified in 2022.
Isfahan	Isfahan BRT	2013	3	33	17 km (11 mi)			Not BRT certified in 2022.
Kerman	Kerman BRT	-	2	-	-			Not BRT certified in 2022.
Mashhad	Mashad BRT	-	5	-	-			Not BRT certified in 2022.
Karaj	Karaj BRT	-	1	-	-			Not BRT certified in 2022.

=== Israel ===
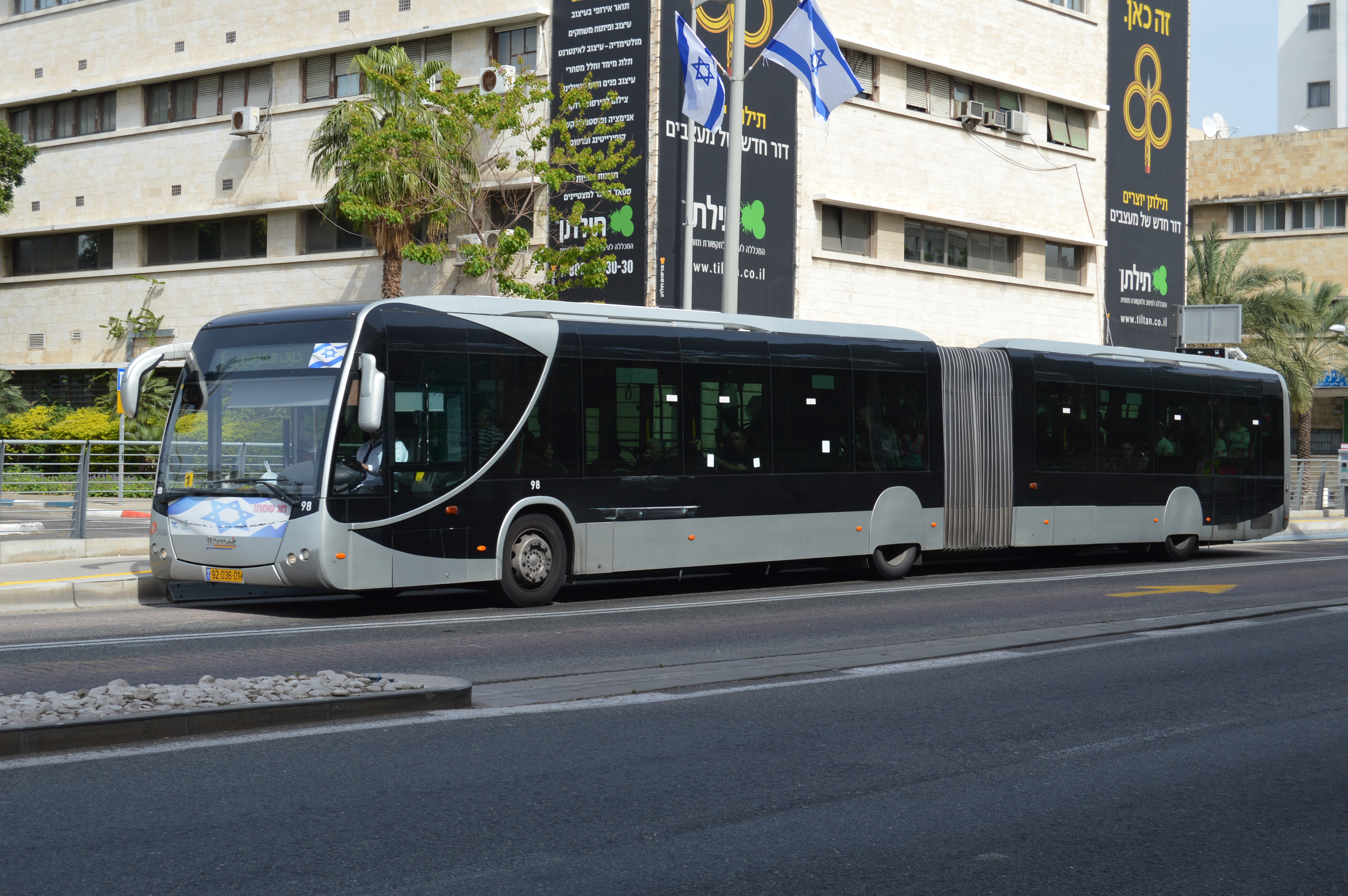
Israel Haifa Metronit bus

BRT systems in Israel
City	System name	Operator	Began	Lines	Stations	Length	Notes/Description	Type	BRT certified
Haifa	Metronit	Superbus	August 2013	5	152	60 km (37 mi)			Not BRT certified in 2022.
Jerusalem	-	Egged Transportation	-	6	-	-	Six lines 71, 72, 74, 75, 77, 78		Not BRT certified in 2022.
Ashdod	-	-	-	2	-	-	Two lines 1, 10		Not BRT certified in 2022.

=== Japan ===
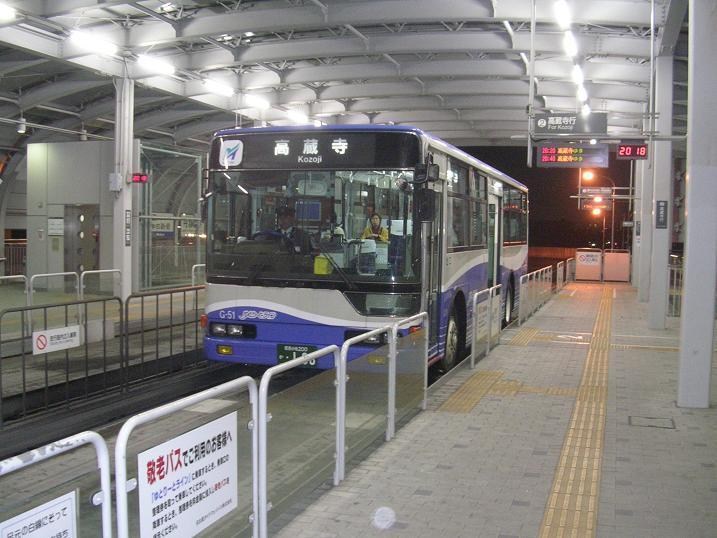
Yutorīto Line in Nagoya

BRT systems in Japan
City	System name	Operator	Began	Lines	Stations	Length	Notes/Description	Type	BRT certified
Ibaraki	Hitachi BRT	Ibaraki Transportation (Kashitetsu Bus) Kantetsu Green Bus.	25 March 2013	1	-	8.5 km (5.3 mi)	Ishioka Station-Ibaraki Airport, Hokota Station		Not BRT certified in 2022.
Nagoya	Yutorito Line	-	23 March 2001	1	9	6.5 km (4.0 mi)			Not BRT certified in 2022.
Niigata Prefecture	Bandai-bashi Line	-	5 September 2015	1	7	7 km (4.3 mi)			Not BRT certified in 2022.
Shirakawa, Fukushima	Hakuhō Line	-	8 October 1916	1	11	23.3 km (14.5 mi)			Not BRT certified in 2022.
Tokyo	Tokyo BRT	-	7 August 2019	1	13	-	Started pre-service by 24 May 2020, and full operations by 2022.		Not BRT certified in 2022.
Soeda, Fukuoka	Fukuoka BRT	Nishitetsu	8 August 2016	1	-	-			Not BRT certified in 2022.
Kobe	Port Loop	Shinki Bus	1 April 2021	1	13	13 km (8.1 mi)			Not BRT certified in 2022.
Kitakyushu	Kitakyushu BRT	-	22 July 2019	-	-	-			Not BRT certified in 2022.
Fukuoka Prefecture	Hitahikosan Line BRT	JR Bus Kyushu Company	28 August 2023	1	36	37.7 km (23.4 mi)			Not BRT certified in 2022.

=== Jordan ===
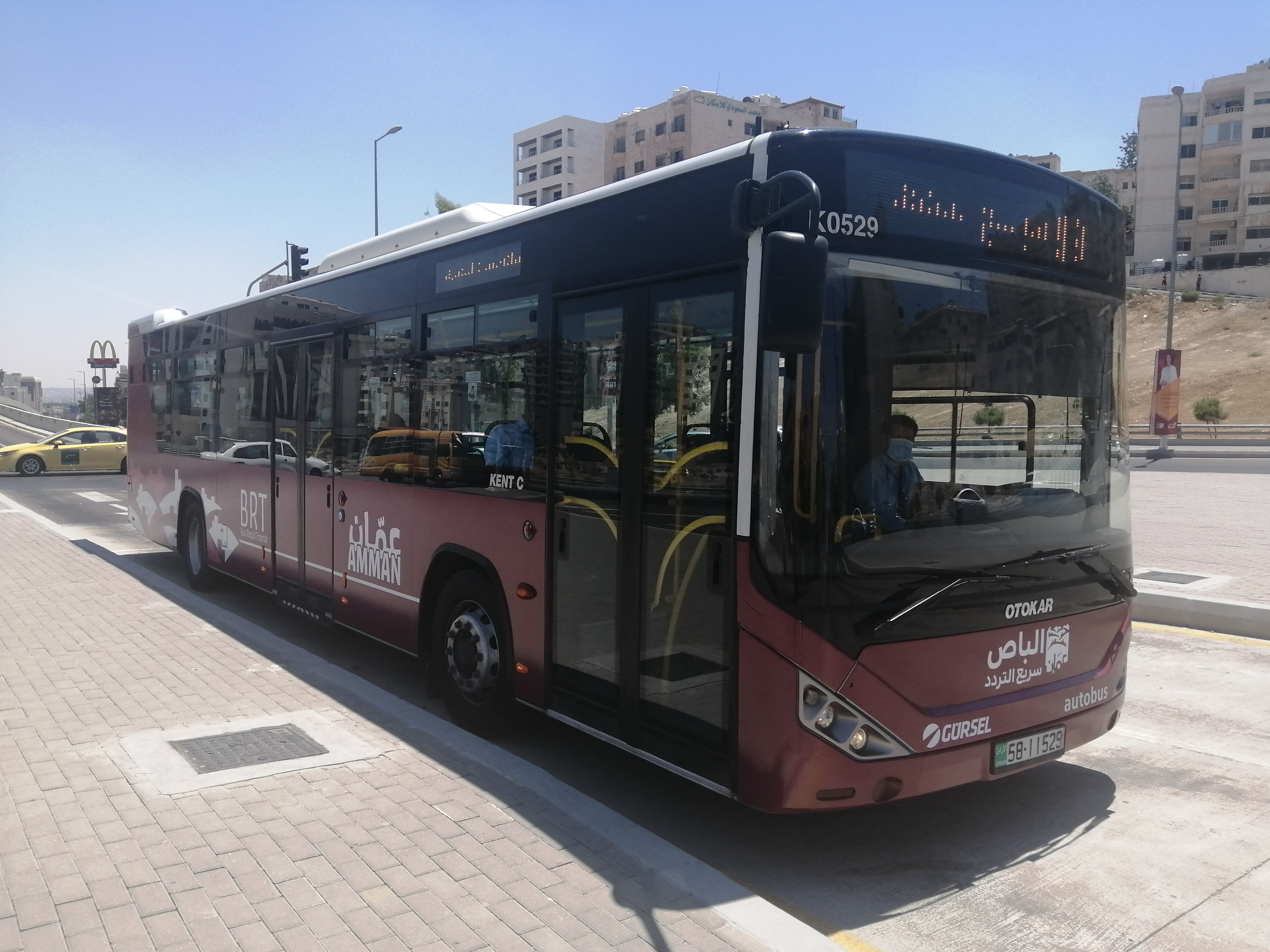
Amman BRT in Amman

BRT systems in Jordan
City	System name	Operator	Began	Lines	Stations	Length	Notes/Description	Type	BRT certified
Amman	Amman Bus Rapid Transit	Gursel - CMTC	27 July 2021	2	34	25 km (16 mi)	Amman Bus Rapid Transit began operation partially in 2021. Phase one has three routes: Route 98, Route 99, and Route 100. Phase two is expected to begin operation in 2022.		Not BRT certified in 2024.
Zarqa	Amman-Zarqa Bus Rapid Transit	-	15 May 2024	1	6	20 km (12 mi)			Not BRT certified in 2024.

=== Kazakhstan ===
In the following table, BRT systems in light blue are under construction.

BRT systems in Kazakhstan
City	System name	Operator	Began	Lines	Stations	Length	Notes/Description	Type	BRT certified
Almaty	Almaty BRT	-	-	-	-	102 km (63 mi)	Almaty Bus Rapid Transit project started in 2014, now operational, 102 km under construction or approved. The first post-Soviet BRT.		

=== Laos ===
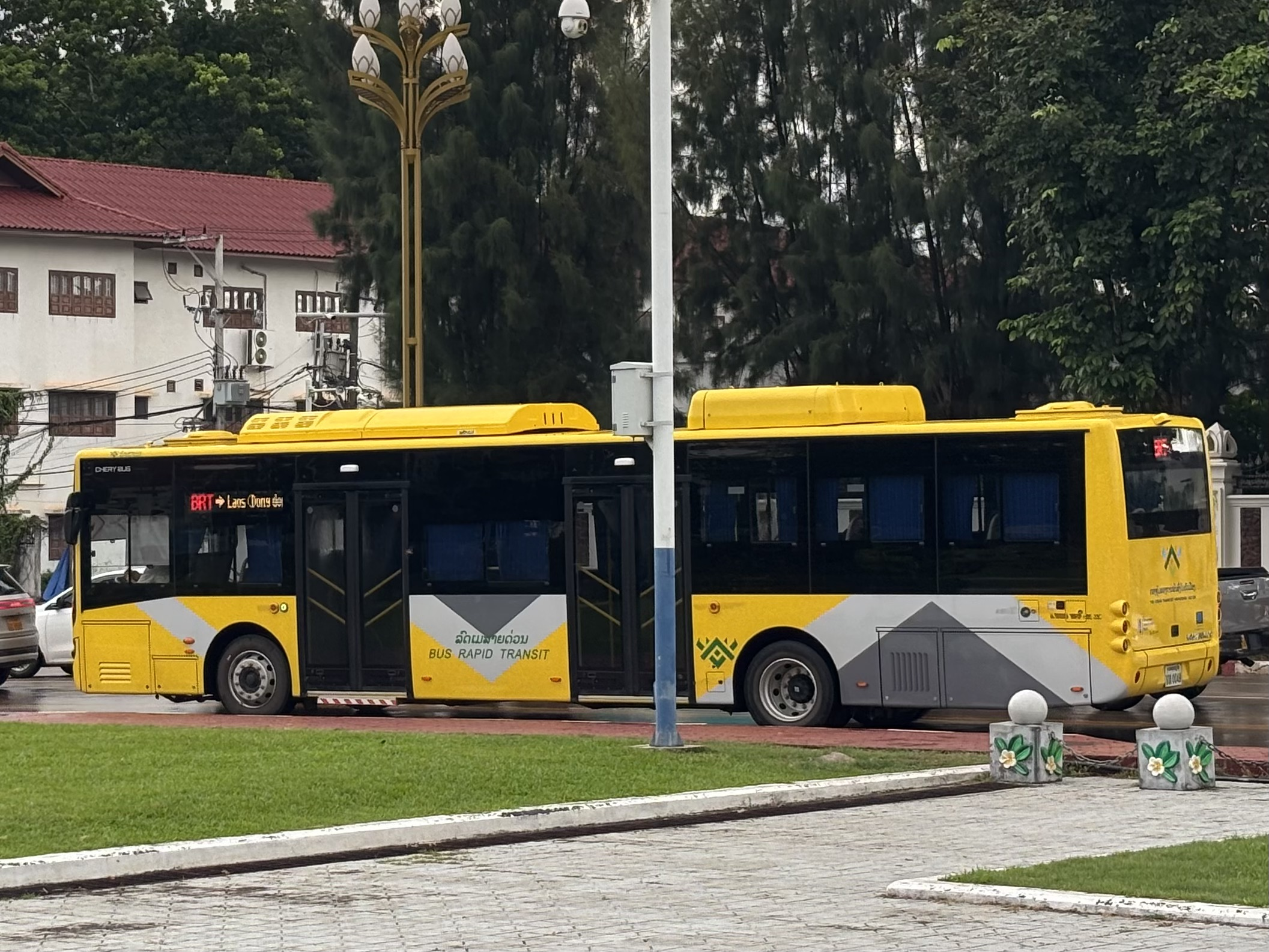
BRT in Vientiane

BRT systems in Laos
City	System name	Operator	Began	Lines	Stations	Length	Notes/Description	Type	BRT certified
Vientiane	Vientiane BRT	Vientiane State Bus Enterprise	March 10, 2026	1	27 (19 currently active)	13.9 km (8.6 mi)	Vientiane Bus Rapid Transit project began in early 2024. The current line runs from the Morning Market (Talat Sao) Station to the National University of Laos (Dongdok) Station.	eBRT electric buses	-

=== Lebanon ===
In the following table, BRT systems in light blue are under construction.

BRT systems in Lebanon
City	System name	Operator	Began	Lines	Stations	Length	Notes/Description	Type	BRT certified
Beirut	-	-	-	-	-	-	Under construction		

=== Malaysia ===
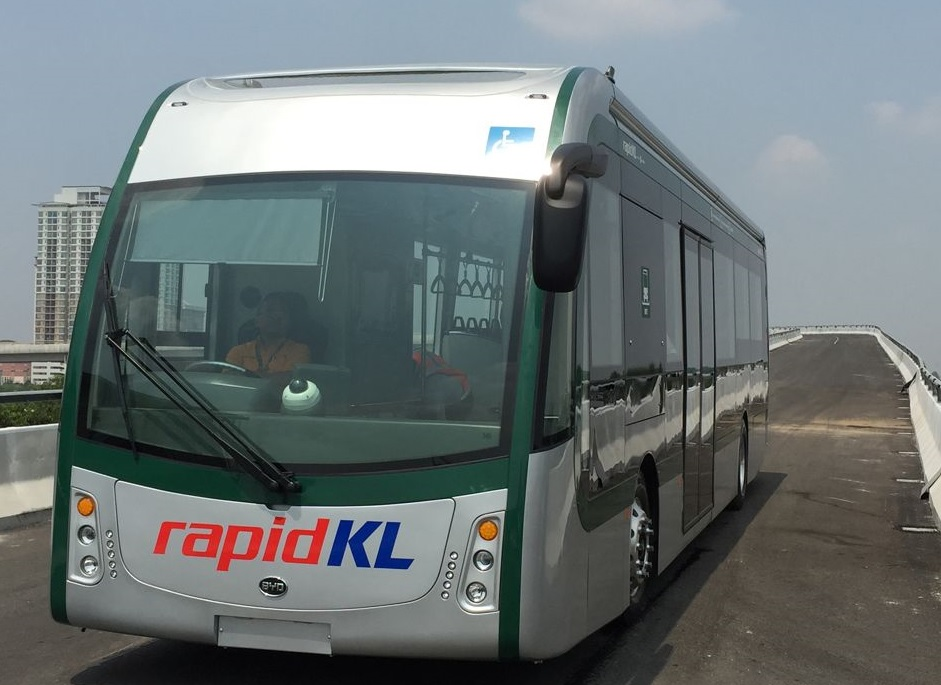
RapidKL BYD K9 electric bus on an elevated guideway, separate from road traffic

BRT systems in Malaysia
City	System name	Operator	Began	Lines	Stations	Length	Notes/Description	Type	BRT certified
Kuala Lumpur	BRT Sunway Line	Rapid Bus	2 June 2015	1	7	5.4 km (3.4 mi)	Malaysia's first BRT system, is 5.4 km long and connects major areas of Bandar Sunway on a dedicated, elevated road. It is Asia's first electric BRT system.	eBRT electric buses	Not BRT certified in 2022.
Iskandar Puteri	Iskandar Malaysia Bus Rapid Transit	Handal Indah (Causeway Link), Maju, S&S International, Transit Link (City Bus)	Shelved	72	32	51 km (32 mi)	It will be the second BRT system to be develop in Malaysia with 51 km in length consist of 3 trunk routes for Tebrau, Skudai and Iskandar Puteri corridors.		Not BRT certified in 2022.

=== Myanmar ===
BRT systems in Myanmar
City	System name	Operator	Began	Lines	Stations	Length	Notes/Description	Type	BRT certified
Yangon	Yangon BRT	-	9 February 2016	2	22	-	The BRT line consists of two line yellow line and blue line connecting to Pyay Rd and Insein Road to central town of Yangon.		Not BRT certified in 2022.

=== Pakistan ===
In the following table, BRT systems in light blue are under construction.

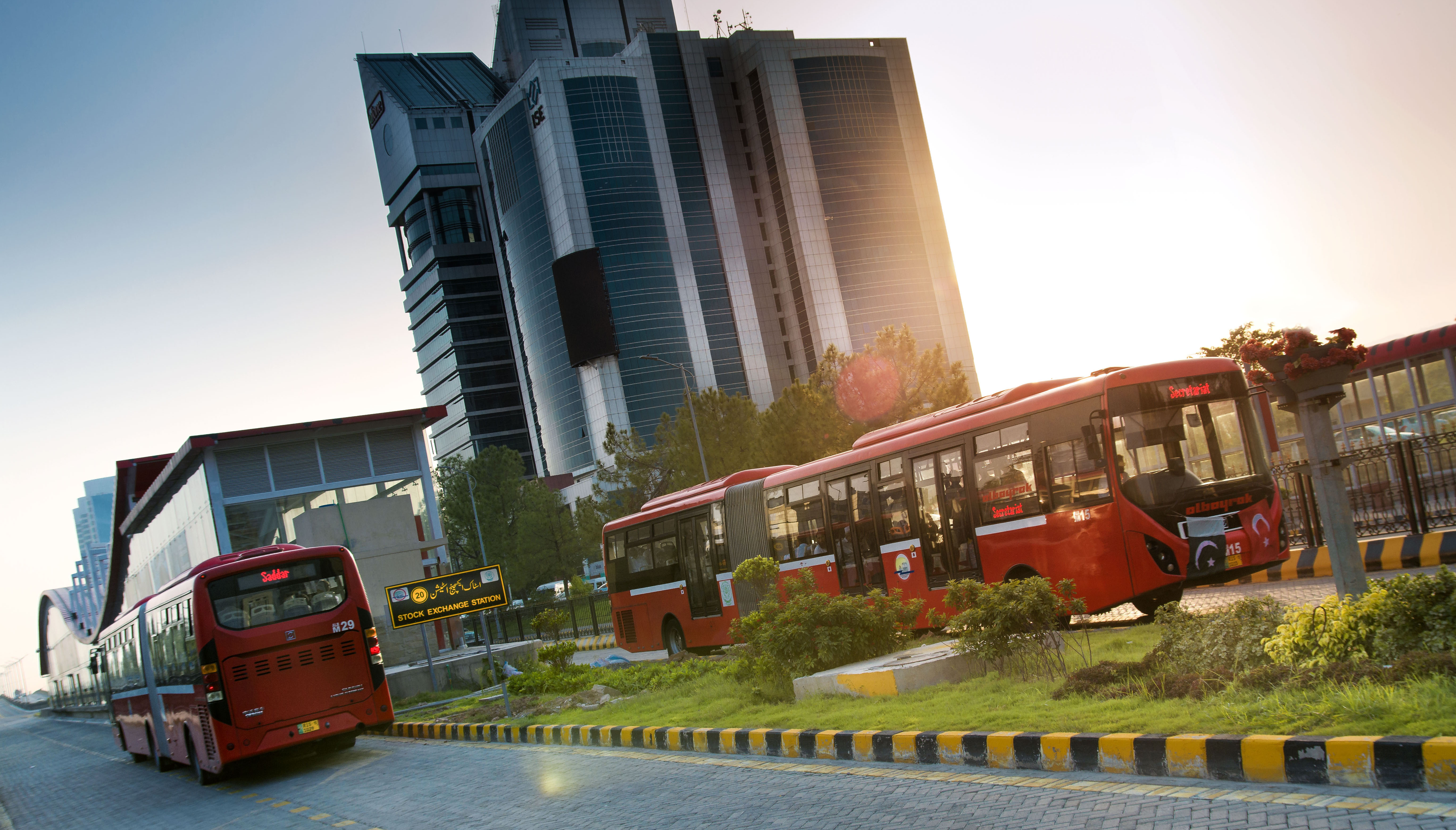
Rawalpindi-Islamabad Metrobus in Islamabad

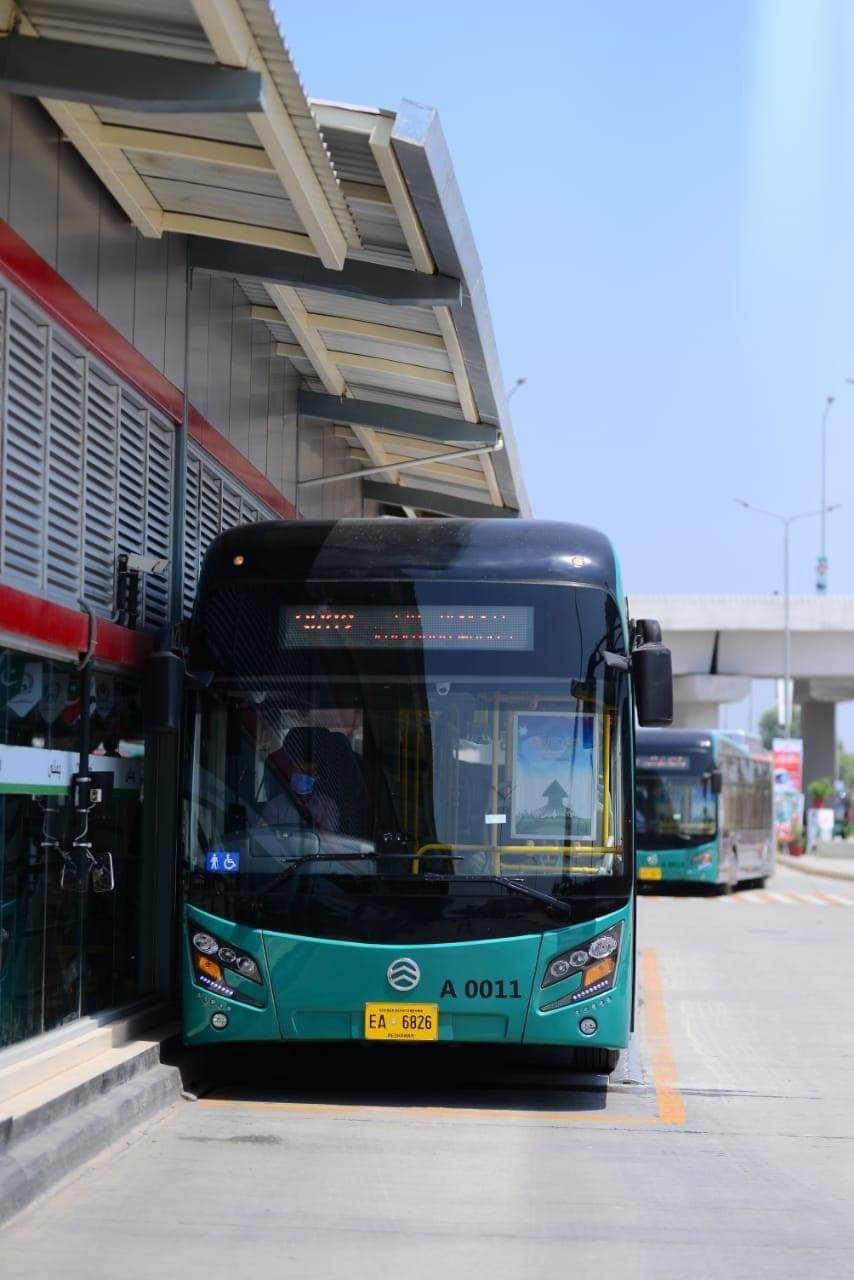
TransPeshawar Buses

BRT systems in Pakistan
City	System name	Region	Began	Lines	Stations	Length	Notes/Description	Type	BRT certified
Lahore	Lahore Metrobus	Punjab	11 February 2013	-	27	27 km (17 mi)			BRT certified (2014)
Rawalpindi and Islamabad	Rawalpindi-Islamabad Metrobus	Punjab and ICT	4 June 2015	4	52	83.6 km (51.9 mi)			Bronze BRT Certified (2014)
Multan	Multan Metrobus	Punjab	24 January 2017	-	21	18.5 km (11.5 mi)			Not BRT Certified (2022)
Peshawar	TransPeshawar	Khyber Pakhtunkhwa	13 August 2020	16	32	27 km (17 mi)			Gold BRT Certified (2016)
Karachi	Karachi Breeze	Sindh	2021	6	22	112.9 km (70.2 mi)			Not BRT Certified (2022)
Faisalabad	Faisalabad Metrobus	Punjab	2026	-	40	70 km (43.5 mi)	-		Gold BRT

=== Philippines ===
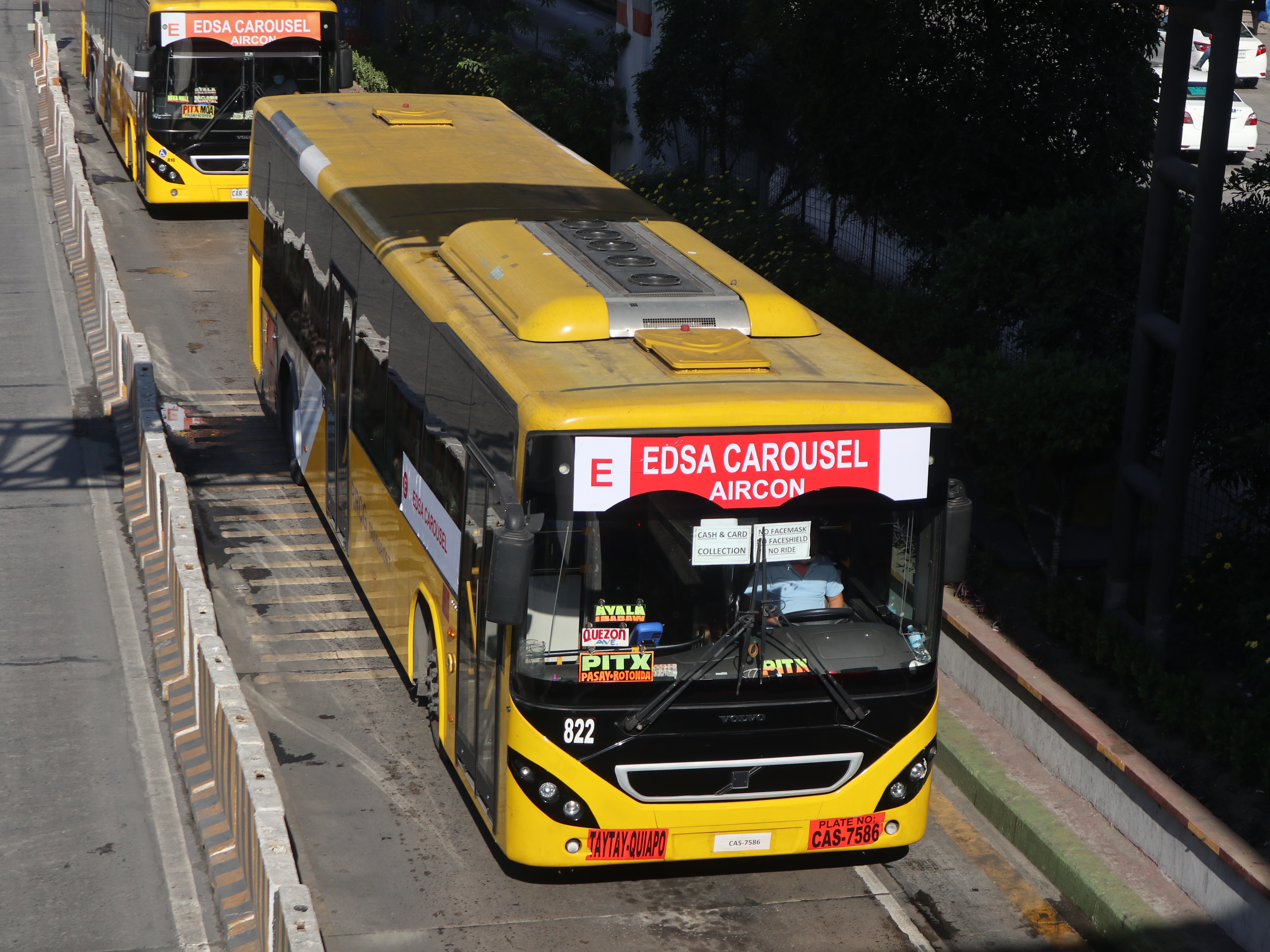
EDSA Carousel bus in Caloocan

In the following table, BRT systems in light blue are under construction.

BRT systems in Philippines
City	System name	Operator	Began	Lines	Stations	Length	Notes/Description	Type	BRT certified
Manila	EDSA Busway	Metropolitan Manila Development Authority and Department of Transportation	1 July 2020	1	23	28 km (17 mi)			Not BRT certified as of 2022.
Cavite	Lancaster New City Link (LNC Link)	-	January 2013	6	8	-			Not BRT certified as of 2022.
New Clark City	Clark Loop	-	December 2019	4	-	-			Not BRT certified as of 2022.
Cebu City	Cebu Bus Rapid Transit System	-	13 March 2026	1	17	13.6 km (8.5 mi)			Not BRT certified in 2024.
Davao City	Davao Bus Project	-	-	29	-	-	Under construction		Not BRT certified in 2024.

=== Saudi Arabia ===
BRT systems in Saudi Arabia
City	System name	Operator	Began	Lines	Stations	Length	Notes/Description	Type	BRT certified
Riyadh	Riyadh Bus	RATP Group/SAPTCO	19 March 2023	3	2,900	1,905 km (1,184 mi)			Not BRT certified in 2022.

=== South Korea ===
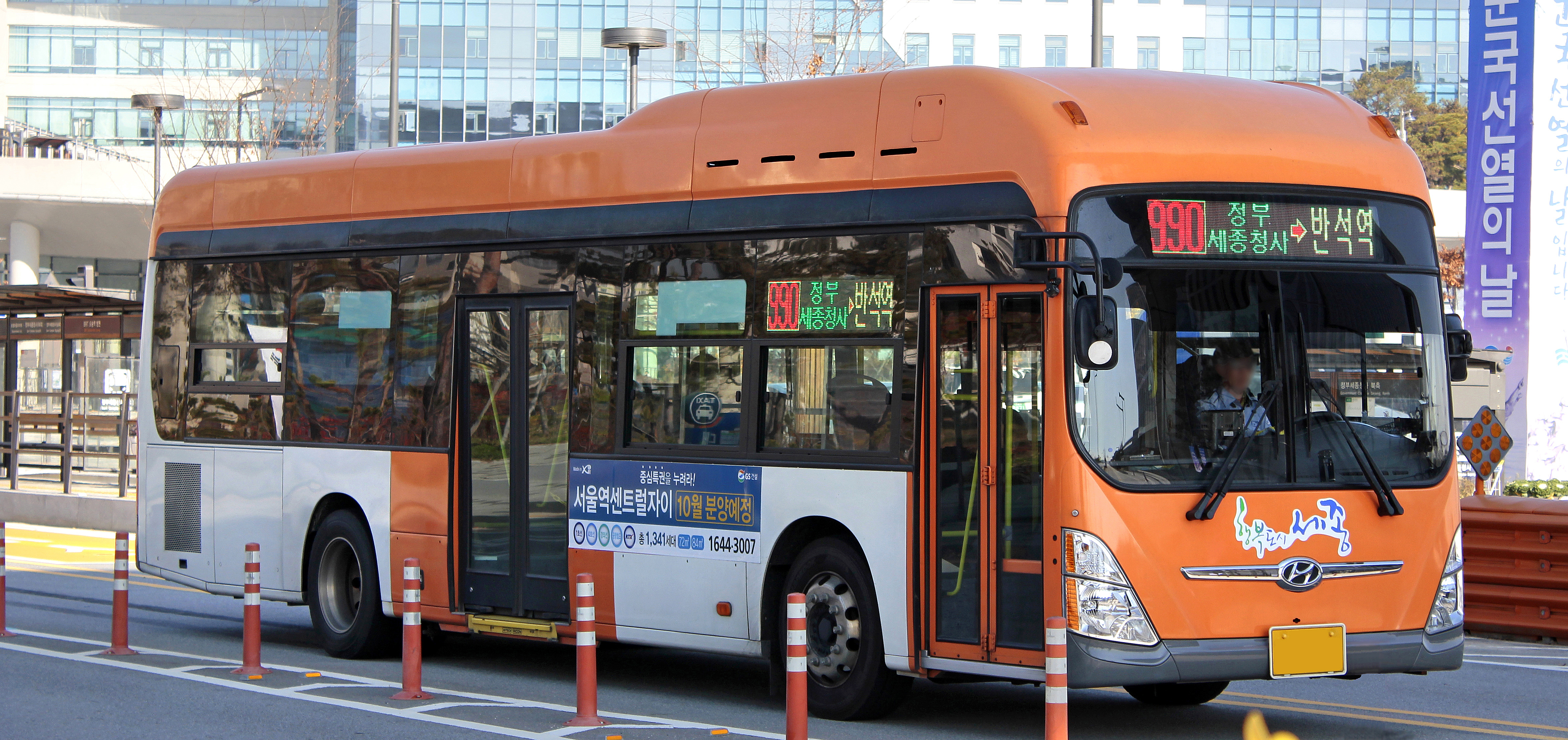
Sejong BRT bus near Government Complex

BRT systems in South Korea
City	System name	Operator	Began	Lines	Stations	Length	Notes/Description	Type	BRT certified
Busan	Busan BRT	Seomyeon-Jagalchi Central BRT	2016	-	-	7.9 km (4.9 mi)			Not BRT certified in 2022.
Daejeon-Osong	Daejeon BRT	Utilizing Sejong dedicated corridor	20 July 2016	-	-	-			Not BRT certified in 2022.
Sejong	Barota BRT	-	1 June 2012	7	-	23.4 km (14.5 mi)			Bronze BRT certified (2016).
Sejong	Barota BRT	Express Intercity B1/B2 Sejongosong-ro	-	-	-	-			Not BRT certified in 2022.
Goyang-Susaek (Seoul)	Goyang Express Bus System	0 - Susack BRT	April 2010	22	54	15.6 km (9.7 mi)	First BRT in South Korea with bus priority signal system.		BRT certified (2014)
Hanam-Cheonho (Seoul)	Hanam Express Bus System	0 - Cheonho-Daero - East	19 March 2011	-	-	10.5 km (6.5 mi)			BRT certified (2014)
Hanam-Cheonho (Seoul)	Hanam Express Bus System	0 - Cheonho-Daero - West	-	-	-	5.4 km (3.4 mi)			BRT certified (2014)
Cheongna International City-Gangseo (Seoul)	Cheongna~Gangseo BRT	-	11 July 2013	12	-	47.6 km (29.6 mi)			BRT certified (2014)
Cheongna International City-Gangseo (Seoul)	Cheongna GRT (BRT)	-	5 February 2018	2	16	19.7 km (12.2 mi)	(701 and 702) Bustram		BRT certified (2014)
Seoul	Korea BRT	Seoul Express Bus Terminal (0 - Gangnam-Daero)	9 June 2004	122	329	4.7 km (2.9 mi)			BRT certified (2014)
Seoul	Korea BRT	0 - Dongsomun-ro/Dobong-ro	-	-	-	14.3 km (8.9 mi)			BRT certified (2014)
Seoul	Korea BRT	0 - Gyeongin-ro	-	-	-	5.6 km (3.5 mi)			BRT certified (2014)
Seoul	Korea BRT	0 - Yeouidaebang-ro/Siheung-daero	-	-	-	9.5 km (5.9 mi)			BRT certified (2014)

=== Taiwan ===
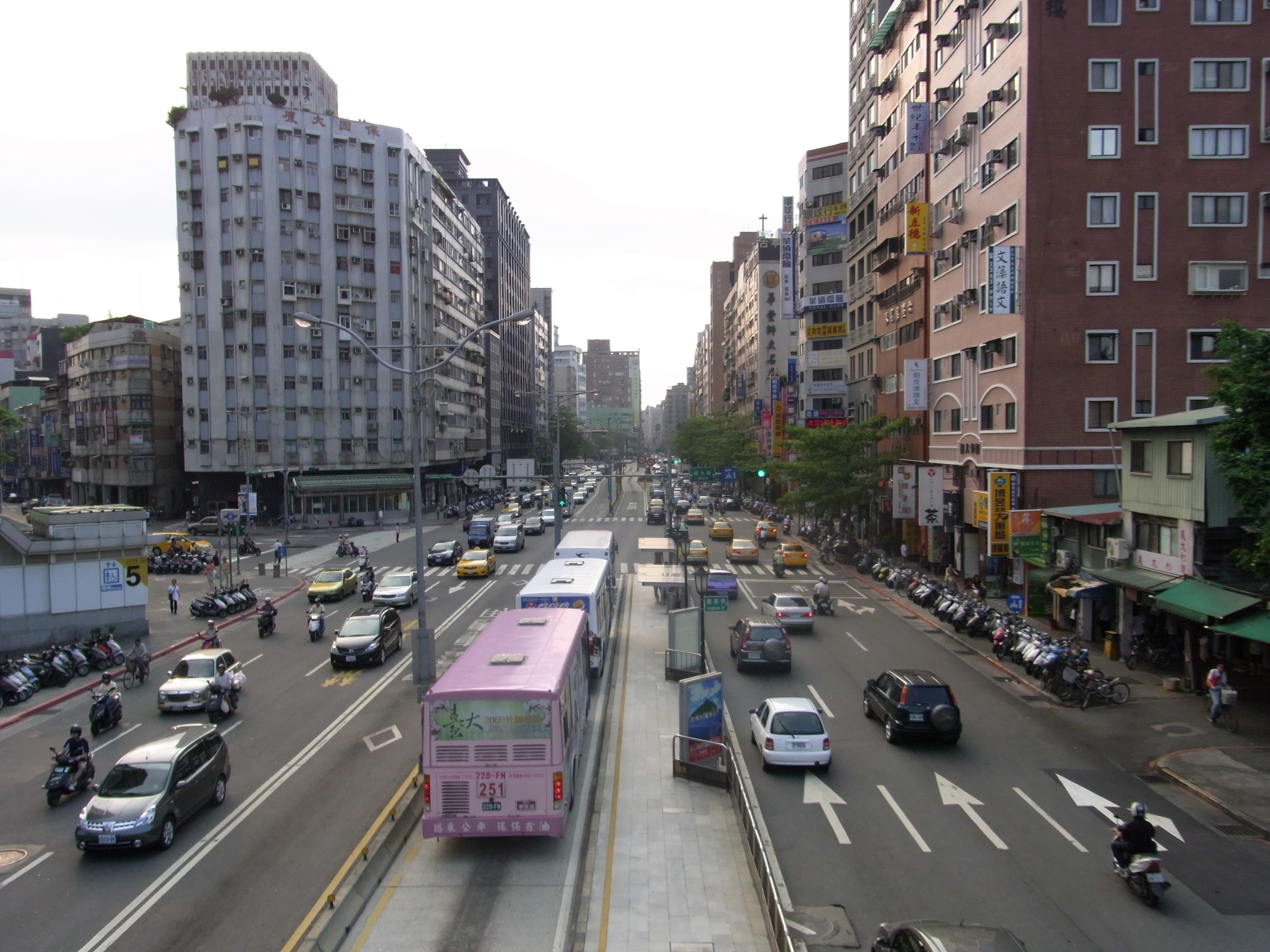
Center-running bus lane and platform in Taipei

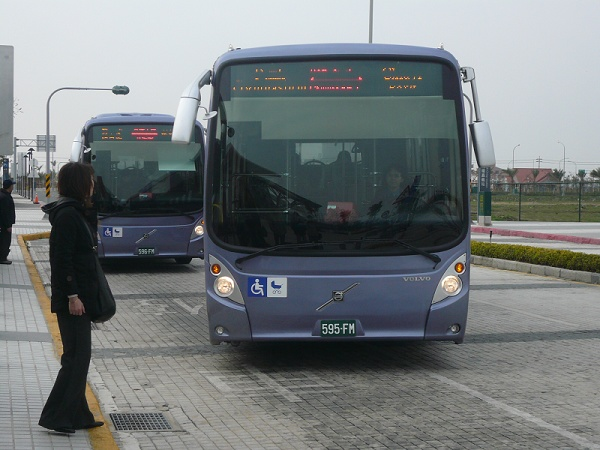
Chiayi BRT

BRT systems in Taiwan
City	System name	Operator	Began	Lines	Stations	Length	Notes/Description	Type	BRT certified
Taipei	Taipei Joint Bus System	15 Civil operation bus transports	1997	16	-	60 km (37 mi)	Dedicated bus lanes, constructed starting in 1996, which include many BRT features, such as raised station platforms.They are used by the Taipei Joint Bus System, including a system of 16 trunk lines that aim to provide "MRT-like" service along arterial roads, with peak headways of four to six minutes.		Not BRT certified in 2014.
Chiayi City	Chiayi Bus Rapid Transit	Chiayi Bus Company	2008	3	18	29.7 km (18.5 mi)	Two routes: 7211 (between Chiayi City Centre and Puzi) and 7212, between the Chiayi TRA station and the Chiayi HSR station.		Not BRT certified in 2014.

=== Thailand ===
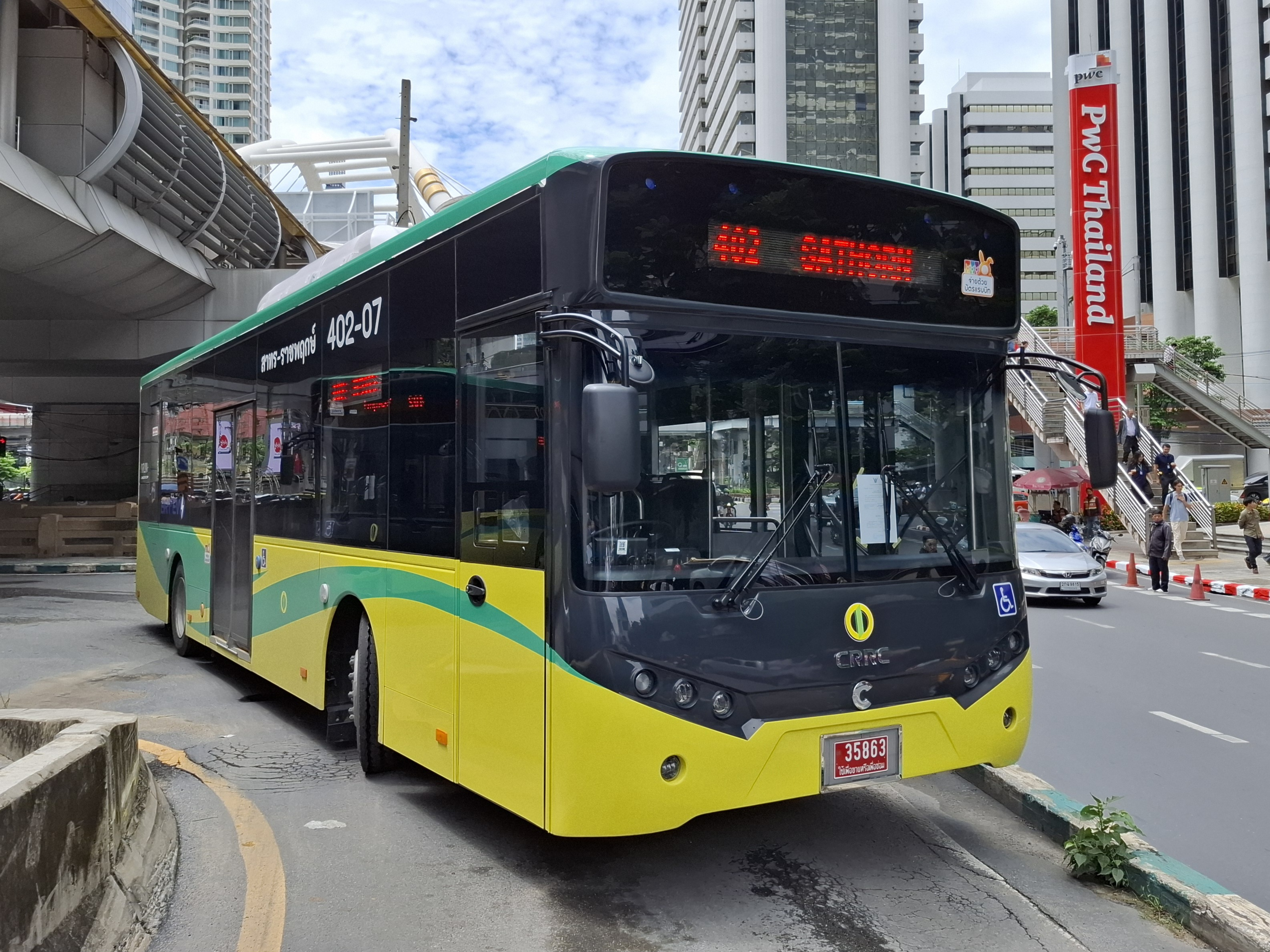
Bangkok BRT

BRT systems in Thailand
City	System name	Operator	Began	Lines	Stations	Length	Notes/Description	Type	BRT certified
Bangkok	Bangkok BRT	Bangkok Mass Transit System Public Company Limited	23 May 2010	5	14	16.5 km (10.3 mi)	The route begins at Sathon and runs along Naradhiwas Rajanagarindra Road, turns right at Rama III Road, crosses the Chao Phraya River on the Rama III Bridge and follows Ratchadaphisek Road before turning right at Ratchahruek Road. At the Sathon-Narathiwat Ratchanakharin intersection, a walkway connects BRT Sathon and the BTS Chong Nonsi station.		Bronze BRT certified (2014).

=== Turkey ===
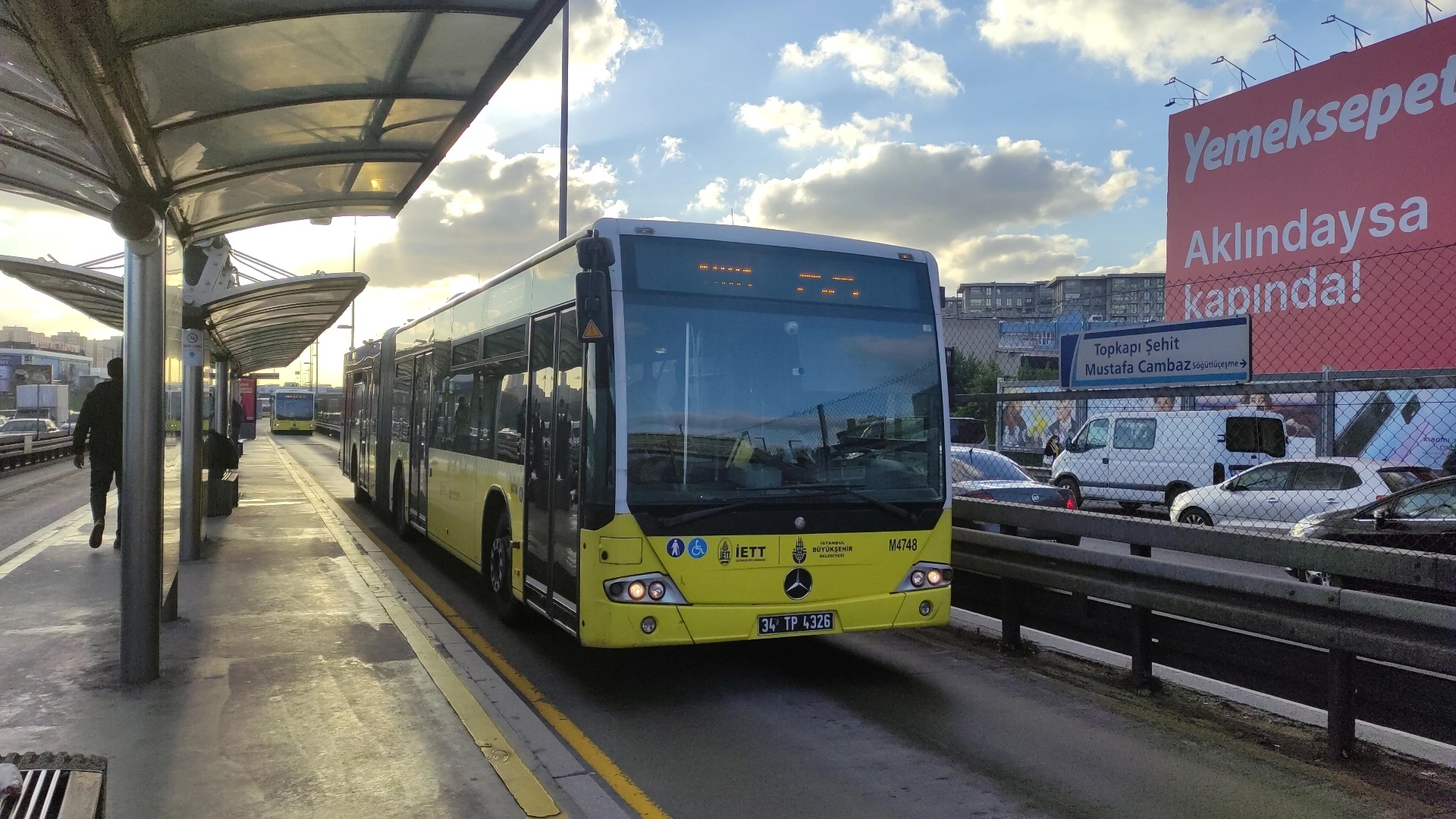
Metrobus-Topkapi in Istanbul

BRT systems in Turkey
City	System name	Operator	Began	Lines	Stations	Length	Notes/Description	Type	BRT certified
Istanbul	Metrobus	İETT	17 September 2007	1	44	52 km (32 mi)	TÜYAP and Söğütlüçeşme, is Turkey first full-service bus rapid transit system. It has a fully separated right-of-way (except crossing the Bosphorus Bridge) and off-bus fare collection.		Silver BRT certified (2014).
Malatya	Malatya Trambus	Motas	10 March 2015	-	53	20 km (12 mi)	Trambus is a mixed-traffic BRT system with bi-articulated trolleybuses.	eBRT trolleybuses	Not BRT certified in 2022.
Urfa (Şanliurfa)	Trambus (Şanliurfa)	-	28 April 2023	1	63	7.7 km (4.8 mi)	Sanliurfa city implemented trolleybus on bus rapid transit.	eBRT trolleybuses	Not BRT certified in 2024.

=== United Arab Emirates ===
In the following table, BRT systems in light blue are under construction.

BRT systems in United Arab Emirates
City	System name	Operator	Began	Lines	Stations	Length	Notes/Description	Type	BRT certified
Dubai	EB1	-	-	-	-	-	Under construction	eBRT electric buses	Not BRT certified in 2022.

=== Vietnam ===
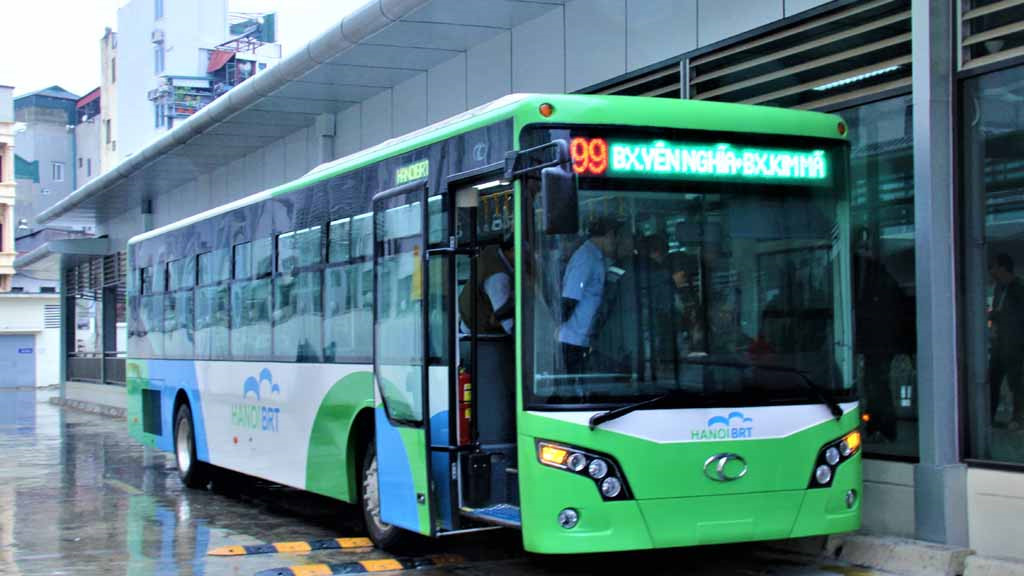
Hanoi BRT 01 (Line 99) bus at the Kim Ma terminal

BRT systems in Vietnam
City	System name	Began	Lines	Stations	Length	Notes/Description	Type	BRT certified
Hanoi	Hanoi BRT	31 December 2016	1	23	14.5 km (9.0 mi)	System runs from the downtown Kim Mã terminal to the Yên Nghĩa terminal in Hanoi's southern suburbs.The system is a component of the Hanoi Urban Transport Development Project, which was approved by the Hanoi People's Committee in Decision 1837/QĐ-UBND on May 10, 2007. The World Bank-funded ODA project is a step in improving the city's urban transport network and increasing public-transport capacity.		Not BRT certified in 2022.
