= Yichang BRT =

Bus service in Yichang, China

Route Map from 15 July 2015 to 24 July 2015.

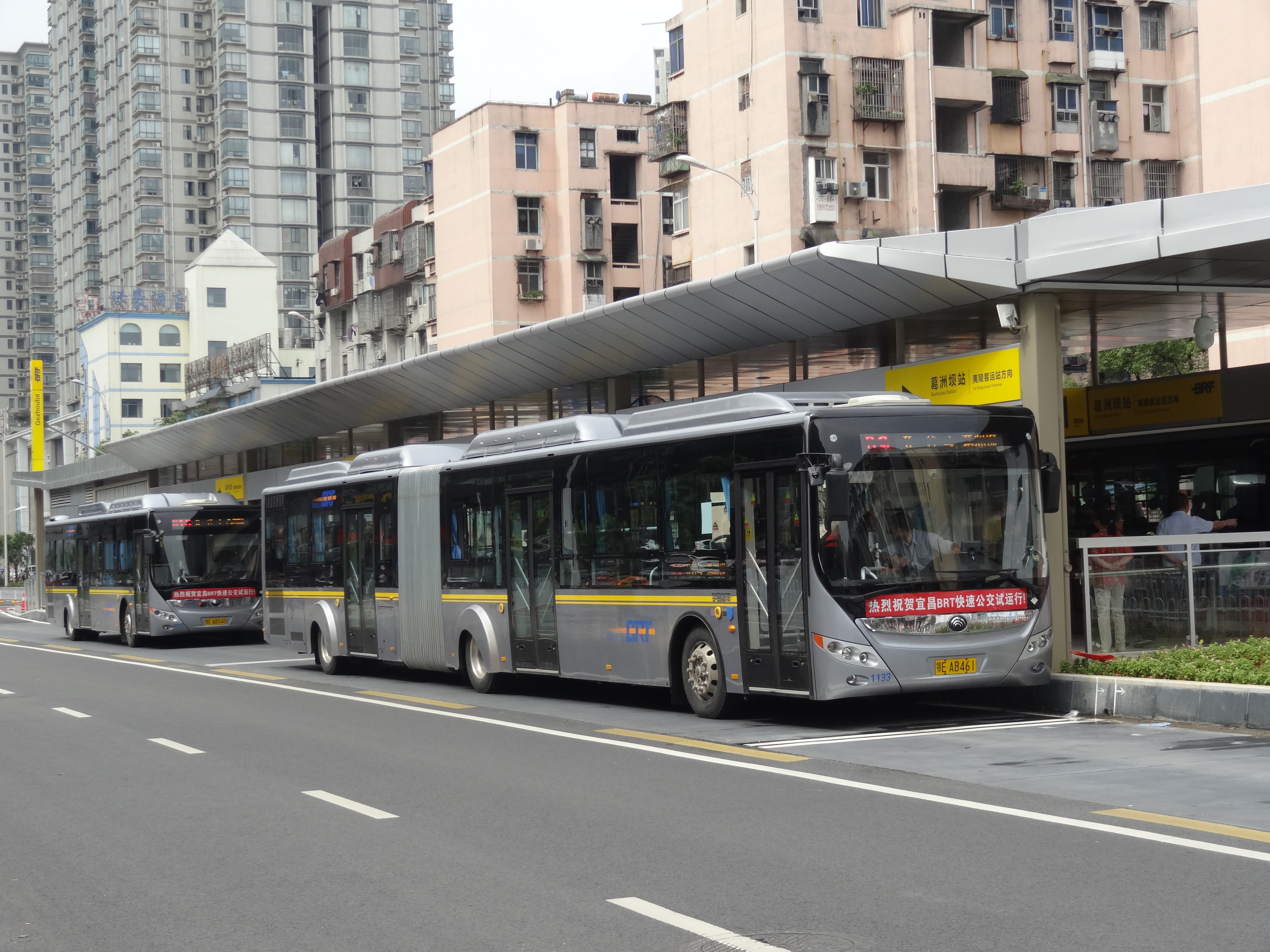
Yichang BRT buses at Gezhouba Station

Yichang BRT or Yichang Bus Rapid Transit, is located in Yichang, China. It is the first Bus rapid transit system constructed in Hubei Province. Yichang BRT runs in the center of the road, and has 38 stations with an average distance of 620 meters between them. The Dongshan Avenue section started service on July 15, 2015, and the corridor in Yiling District started service November 24, 2015. Yichang BRT won the 2016 Sustainable Transport Award.

== Route ==
B9 is the main line for the Yichang BRT. It starts from Yichang East Railway Station and stops at every station until Gezhouba. After construction of Yemingzhu Road, it will extend to Yiling Coach Terminal.

== See also ==
- Yichang Metro
