= Hyderabad Bus Rapid Transit System =

Planned bus rapid transit system in Hyderabad, India

Hyderabad BRTS

Overview
- Locale: Hyderabad, India
- Transit type: Bus rapid transit

Operation
- Began operation: Proposed
- Operators: hyderabad airport metro limited Hyderabad Metropolitan Development Authority

Technical
- System length: 20 kilometres (12 mi)

The Hyderabad BRTS is a planned bus rapid transit system for the Indian city of Hyderabad, India. One corridor has been identified for testing the BRT System. Electrically powered Articulated Buses are being proposed to be used on the corridor.

The primary corridor stretches approximately 18–20 km, starting from KPHB (Kukatpally), passing through the Financial District, and ending at Kokapet Neopolis.

== Corridor ==
The following corridor was identified for BRTS

Corridor: KPHB - JNTU - Malaysian Township - Shilparamam - Mindspace - IIIT - Financial Dist - narsingi - kokapet
