= Rajkot Bus Rapid Transit System =

Bus rapid transit system in Gujarat, India

Rajkot BRTS

Overview
- Owner: Rajkot Municipal Corporation
- Locale: Rajkot, India
- Transit type: Bus rapid transit
- Number of lines: 1
- Number of stations: 19
- Daily ridership: 15,000-17,000

Operation
- Began operation: 1 October 2012
- Operator: Rajkot Rajpath Limited

Technical
- System length: 10.5 kilometres (6.5 mi)
Operational Blue Line Transit map
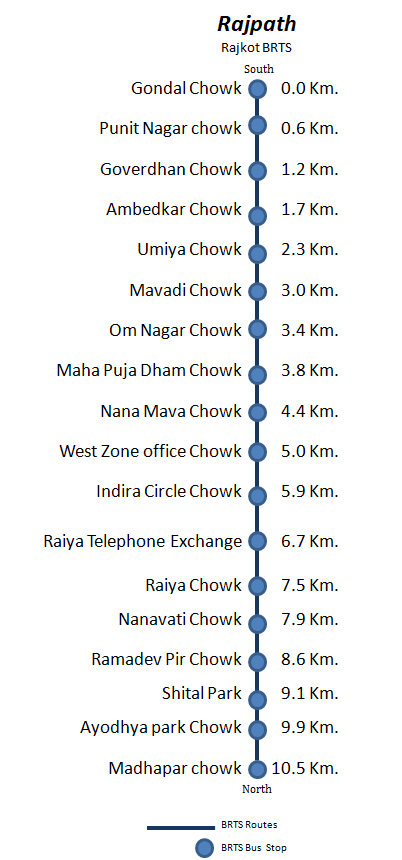

The Rajpath or Rajkot BRTS is a bus rapid transit system in Rajkot, Gujarat, India, operated by Rajkot Rajpath Ltd. and owned by Rajkot Municipal Corporation.

== Plan ==
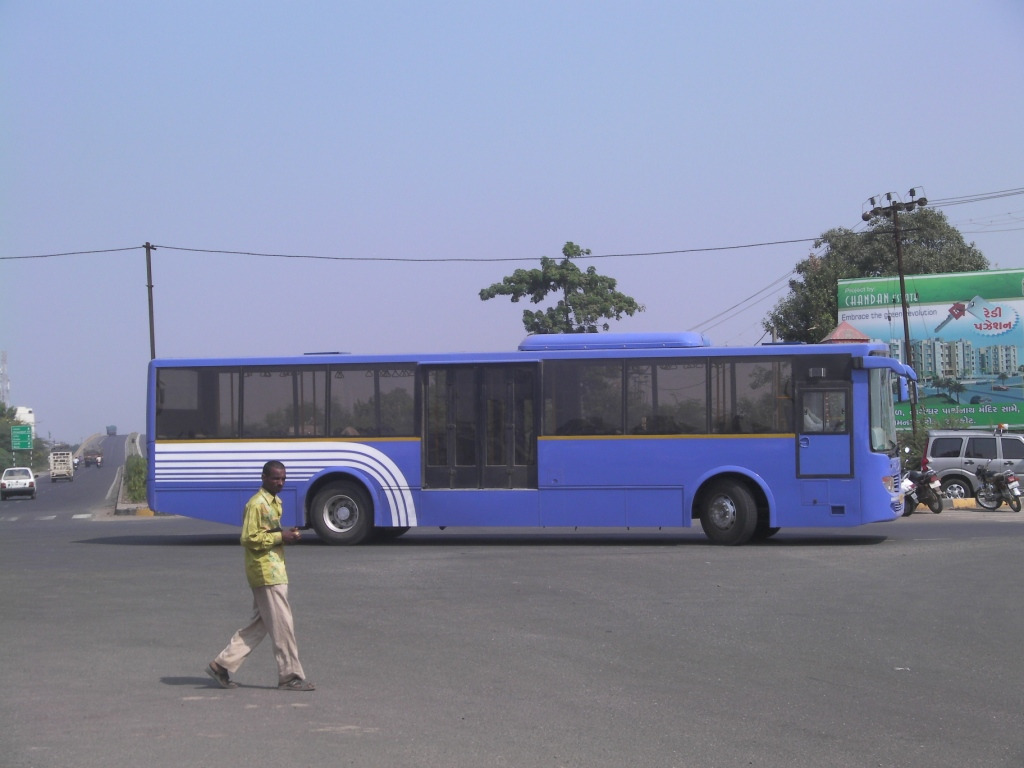
BRT bus used in Rajkot

Rajkot City Engineer (Special) Vijay Anadkat has planned a total of 63 km of Rajkot BRTS.

In the first phase, which occurred from 2007 to 2011, a 29 km long stretch on a 150-foot (46 m) Ring Road would be developed. This stretch would be known as Blue Corridor. The BRTS project is being developed as per National Urban Transport Policy (NUTP) guidelines. The total project cost for the pilot stretch of 10.7 km of Blue Corridor is Rs. 110 crores.

The funding for the project would come from the Jawaharlal Nehru National Urban Renewal Mission (JNNURM). Rajkot falls under city category B for getting financial assistance from the Government of India to implement the project. The funding division for the total project cost will be as shown: Govt. of India (50%), Govt. of Gujarat (20%), RMC (30%). Ministry of Urban Development, the Government of India has already sanctioned Rs. 55 crores to RMC.

Local authorities plan to purchase state-of-the-art buses. The purchase parameters for the buses would be CNG fuel, power steering, high speed, non-polluting fuel, modernized engine technology, GPS-based control, and communication system, and high passenger carrying capacity with comfortable sitting arrangements. The buses will adhere to Urban Bus Specifications published by the Ministry of Urban Development and will follow the latest mandate for emission norms of India as per the Central Pollution Control Board.

- The BRT bus with the right side doors
- BRT Bus and the station platform at the same level, facilitating ease of boarding and alighting
- Bus approaching a station and off-board fare collection at the station

Initially, a 10.70 km-long stretch would be constructed from Jamnagar crossroad to Gondal crossroad, covering 18 bus stops as part of Blue Corridor. Then, the work on 9.16 km-long stretch from Jamnagar Road to Morbi Road would be taken up. This would be followed by the construction of a 9.14 km Morbi-Gondal Road stretch.

The next two corridors Green and Red from Arvind Maniyar Nagar to Saurashtra University and Green Land Chowk to Saurashtra University would be taken up at a later stage.

A fleet of 156 luxury buses will run on all three corridors 70 blue, 25 green, and 61 red.

== Corridors for BRTS ==
Blue Corridor (Ring Road) Corridor:

The Ring Road of Rajkot city, which has 45 m width and passes through all important centers of the city, has an excellent opportunity to reduce traffic congestion problems and stress. The length of the ring road is 29.00 km.

Ring road which overlays with National Highways 8 B:

Out of 29.00 km total length of Ring Road about 9.14 km overlaps with National Highway 8 B. The width of the road in this section is 60 m. The development of National Highway 8 B is carried out by the National Highway Authority under the Prime Minister's National Highway Development Program. The work of development of this stretch is at an advanced stage of completion. This will be considered in Part III of the BRTS program(Phase I). However, at the end of the phase and the start of the BRTS, the NH will be used as a mixed corridor.

Ring road which passes through Rajkot Urban Development Area:

About 9.16 km of length of ring road falls under RUDA and will be considered as Phase-II of Blue Corridor development.

Ring road which passes through Rajkot Municipal Corporation area:

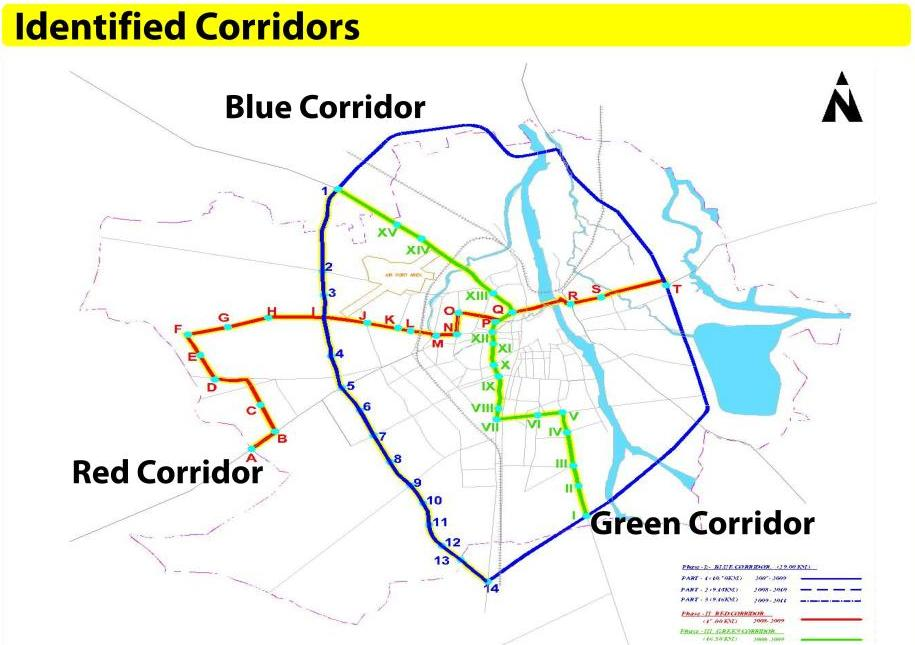
Identified corridors

Out of 29.00 km total length of BRTS, about 10.70 km pass through the RMC area and will be developed in Part I of in first Phase of the BRTS Program. There are eighteen stations in this part of the BRTS section. These are:

No	Corridor
1	RAJKOT
2	Lakhbunglow 80' road
3	Raiya Road Circle
4	Raiya Telephone Exchange
5	Royal Park
6	Big Bazar
7	Nanamava Circle
8	Balaji Hall
9	Mavdi Circle
10	Dhareswar Chowk
11	Tirupati Chowk
12	Jayvijay Hostel
13	Punit Nagar
14	Gondal Road & Ring Road Crossing

Green Corridor (North-South Corridor)

The north–south corridor provides connectivity to residential areas like Press Colony, Radio Colony, Bajarangwadi, Jam Tower area along Jamnagar road and Panchnath temple area, Limda Chowk area, Moti tank area, Rajput para, Bhaktinagar Circle, Sorathiya wadi circle, Kothariya road, devparachowk, Arvindbhai maniyar quarter, and Kothariya road and National high way crossing. The corridor also provides connectivity to major hospitals like Western Railway Hospital, Civil Hospital, Janana Hospital Madhuram Hospital, etc. The institutional areas like Choudhury High School, Mohandas Gandhi Vidyalaya, Sheth High School, etc. are connected to the corridor the length of this corridor is 12.30 – 16.50 km. 11 stations along the corridor have been identified at the following locations:

No	Corridor
1	Kothriya Road Octroi Naka
2	Nanda Hall Circle
3	Dev Para Chowk
4	Nilkanth Cinema
5	Sorthiya Wadi Chowk
6	Bhakti Nagar Circle
7	Makkam Chowk
8	Satyvijay patel ice Cream Chowk
9	Lodhawad Chowk
10	Malaviya Chowk
11	Limda Chowk
12	Stock Exchange
13	Chaudhary High School
14	Civil Hospital
15	Morbi House
16	Press Colony
17	I.O.C.
18	Jamnagar Road & Ring Road Crossing

Red Corridor (East-West Corridor)

The east–west corridor is of 16.50 km up ward with 12 stations. It starts from Ambedkar Nagar in the west on Kalavad Road, passes along Mahila College, Kisanpara junction, Race Course junction, Sadar Bazar, Choudhury High School, Civil Hospital, and along Kuvadwa road till Kuvadwa Road-Ring Road junction on the eastern side.

This corridor provides connectivity to development along Kalavad Road areas such as Ambedkar Nagar, Sadguru Nagar, Jalaram Society, Swaminarayan Temple, and residential areas along Sadar Bazar Road and Kuvadwa Road. The corridor also provides connectivity to institutional areas like Virani Science College, Chaudhury High School and public & semi-public institutions such as A.G office, Panchayat office, Police Commissioner's Office, Press area, Stock Exchange, Civil Hospital, District Court and Collector's Office etc. The length of the Red Corridor is 16.50 km. A total of twelve stations along the corridor have been identified at the following locations:

No	Name
1	Kalawad Road.Octroi Naka
2	A.G. Society
3	Pushkar Dham
4	B.T.Savani Hospital/University
5	Gangotry Park
6	Raiya Village
7	Aallap Green City
8	Kevallam Chowk
9	Raiya Circle
10	Brahmsamaj Chowk
11	Hanuman Madhi Chowk
12	Amrapali Cinema
13	Kishan Para Chowk
14	Jilla Panchayat Chowk
15	Bahumali Seva Sadan
16	Chaudhry High School Chowk
17	Civil Hospital Chowk
18	Delux cinema
19	Sadguru Ashram
20	Ahmedabad Road & Ring Road Crossing

== Sources ==
- Rajkot Rajpath qualifies as a semi-finalist for International Transport Forum Award 2013 - ()
- Free rides in Rajkot BRT discontinued -
- The Government of Gujarat gives Rs. 6.90 crores for implementing IT systems in Rajkot BRTS -
