= Vijayawada Bus Rapid Transit System =

Bus system in India

Vijayawada BRTS
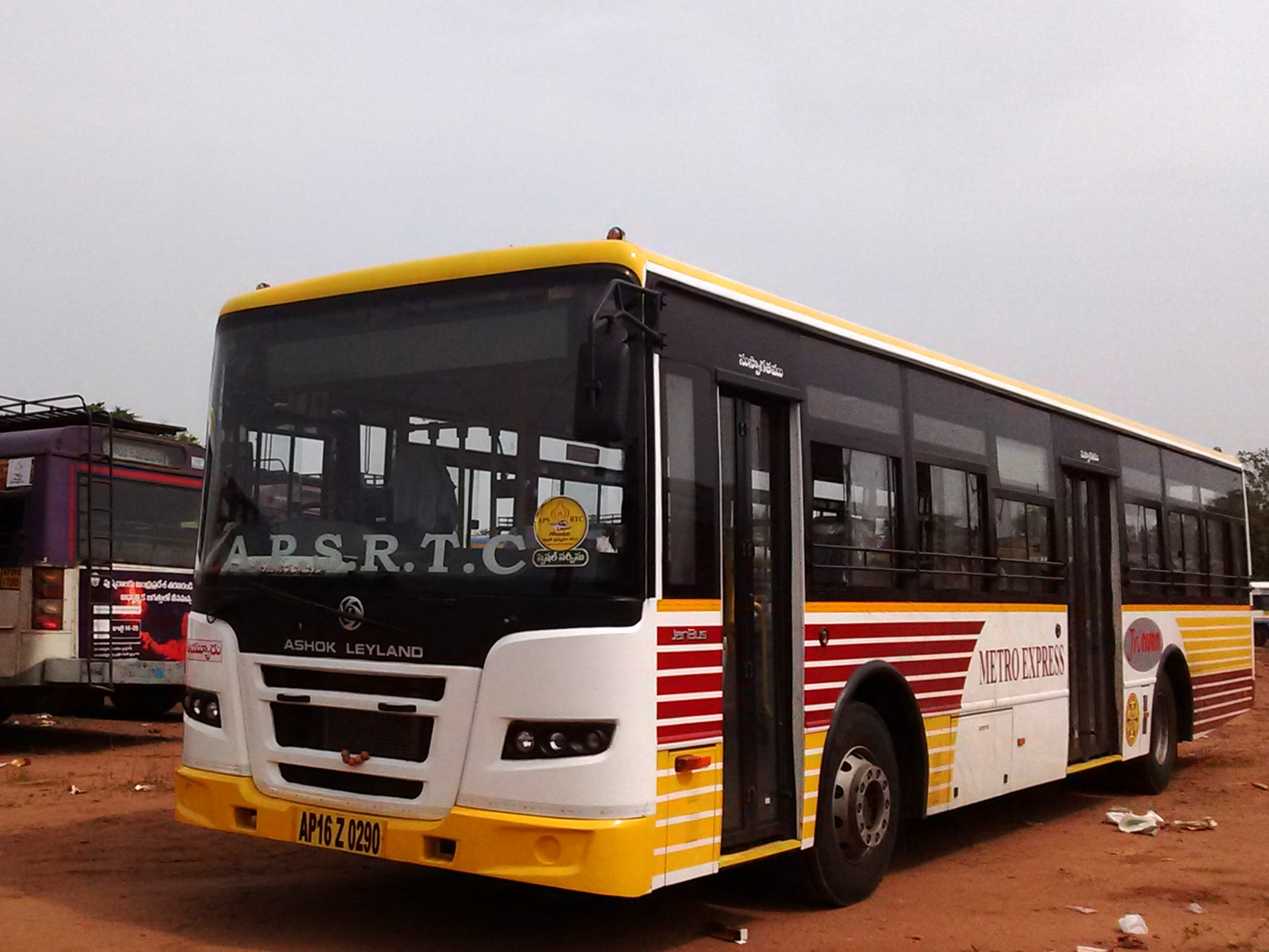
- Buses used in Vijayawada BRTS

Overview
- Area served: Vijayawada
- Locale: Vijayawada, Andhra Pradesh, India
- Transit type: Bus rapid transit
- Number of lines: 6

Operation
- Operator: APSRTC

The Vijayawada BRTS is a bus rapid transit system for the city of Vijayawada. Six BRTS corridors were proposed under JNNURM at a cost of ₹450 crore (US$48 million).

== Corridors ==
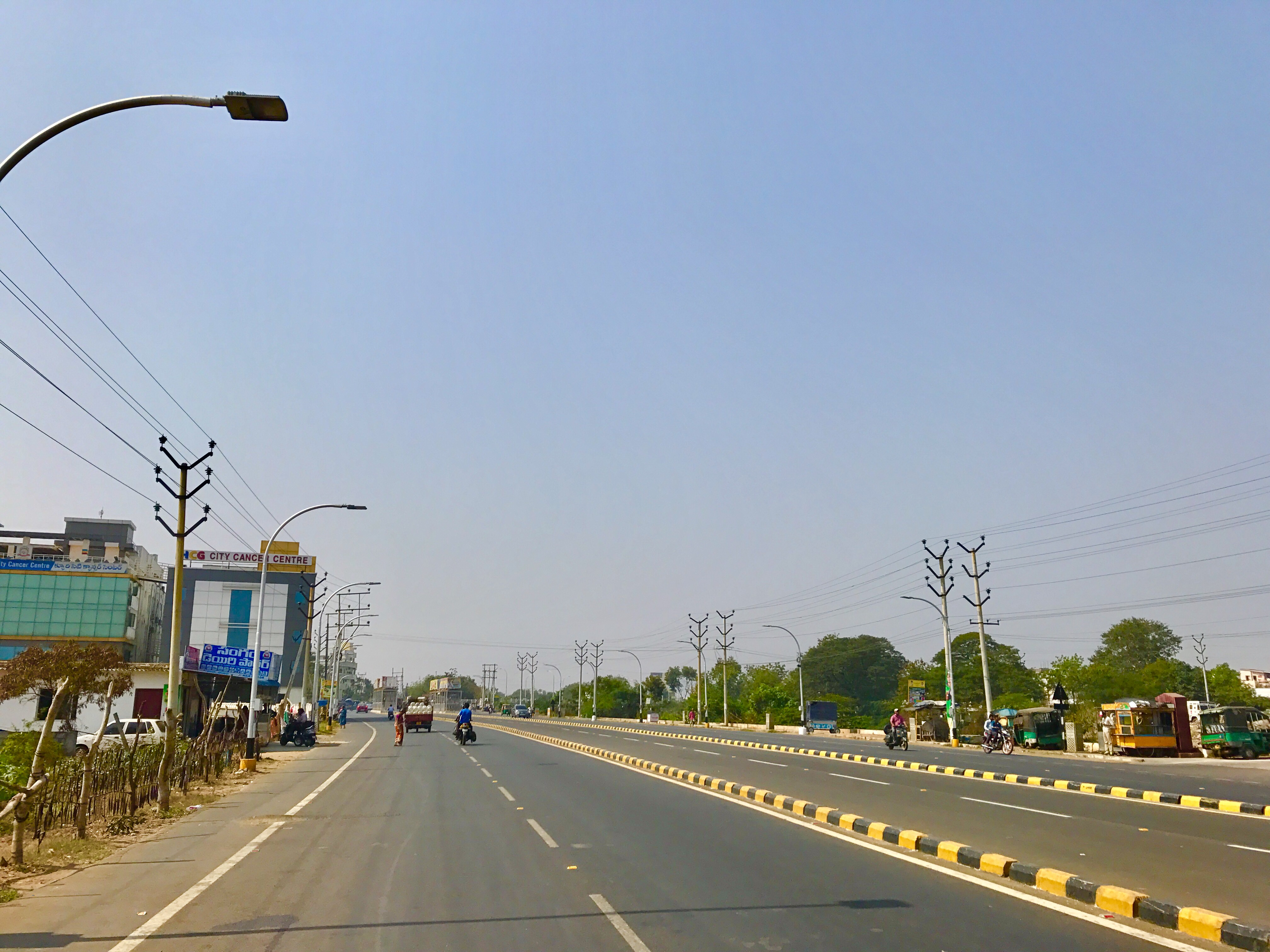
BRTS road near Gunadala

There are six corridor for Vijayawada Bus Rapid Transist system are listed below: Minimum route is of Bus terminal to City bys complex with length of 2.62 km and longest route is bus terminal to city bus terminal (round trip) (via Ramavarappadu Ring road junction, Benz circle) with length of 15.50 km.

Corridors	Route	Length in km.
Green (Loop Road)	Bus terminal – Ramavarappadu Ring Road Junction – Benz Circle – City Bus Terminal	15.50 km
Red (Eluru Road)	Bus terminal - S.R.R. College – Padavala Revu	4.60 km
Blue (G.S.Raju Road)	Bus terminal – Government Press – Nunna	12 km
Orange	Bus terminal – Benz Circle – Auto Nagar Junction – Kanuru – Tadigadapa – Poranki	4.5 km
Yellow (Route No.5 Road)	Bus terminal – Swarna Palace Hotel Junction – Besant Road – Madhu Kala Mandapam – Executive Club – Gurunanak Colony Junction – Auto Nagar	6.15 km
Brown (Loop Road)	Bus terminal – Kalakshetram – Low Bridge – Municipal Corporation Office – Rajiv Gandhi Park – City Bus Complex	2.62 km
