= Hangzhou BRT =

Bus service in Hangzhou, China

Overview
- Locale: Hangzhou
- Transit type: Bus rapid transit
- Number of lines: 3
- Number of stations: 50
- Daily ridership: 40,000 passengers/day

Operation
- Began operation: 2006
- Operator: Hangzhou Public Transport Group
- Number of vehicles: 104

Technical
- System length: 55.4 kilometers (34.4 mi)
- Average speed: 15 km/h

Hangzhou Bus Rapid Transit (BRT) is a bus rapid transit system in Hangzhou, Zhejiang, China. It began operations in 2006 with 27.2 km of service (7 km of busway). The system was expanded with two additional line extensions in 2008, 2009 and 2010 now provide passengers with 55.4 km (18.8 km of busways) of BRT service.
