= Swami Vivekananda Airport =

Airport serving Raipur, Chhattisgarh, India

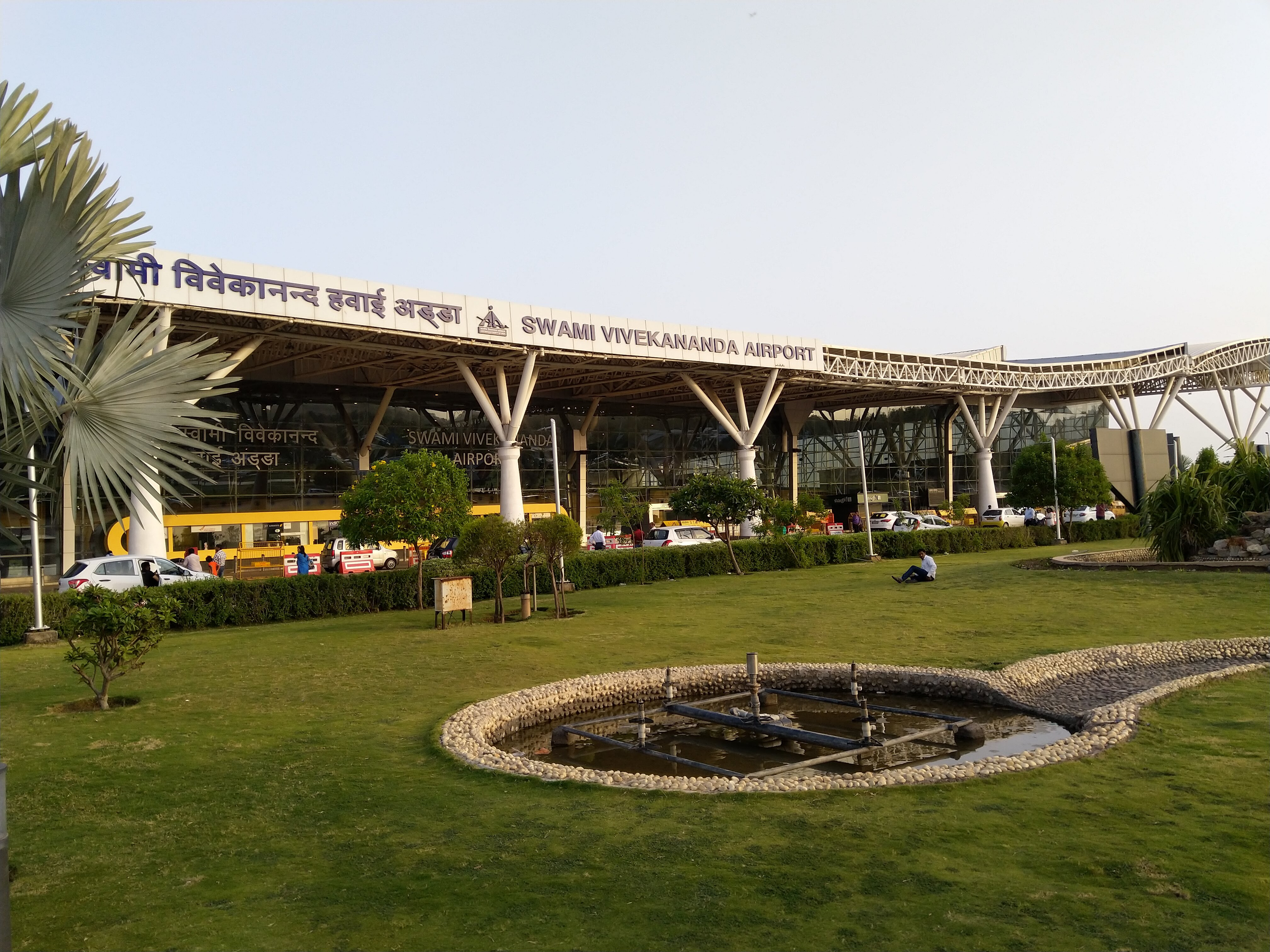
- IATA: RPR; ICAO: VERP

Summary
- Airport type: Public
- Owner: Airports Authority of India
- Operator: Airports Authority of India
- Serves: Raipur Metropolitan Region
- Location: Mana, Raipur, Chhattisgarh, India
- Opened: 1975; 51 years ago
- Time zone: IST (+5:30)
- Elevation AMSL: 317 m (1,040 ft)
- Coordinates: 21°10′53″N 081°44′26″E
- Website: Raipur Airport

Maps
- Location of airport in India RPR (India)
- Interactive map of Swami Vivekananda Airport

Runways
Direction	Length		Surface
Direction	m	ft	Surface
06/24	3,250	10,662	Asphalt

Helipads
Number	Length		Surface
Number	m	ft	Surface
H1	20	65	Concrete

Statistics (April 2025 - March 2026)
- Passengers: 27,63,498 (▲7.4%)
- Aircraft movements: 21,932 (▲9.6%)
- Cargo tonnage: 5,588.5 (▲10%)
- Source: Airports Authority of India

Swami Vivekananda Airport (IATA: RPR, ICAO: VERP), formerly known as Mana Airport, is a domestic airport serving the Raipur Metropolitan Region in the Indian state of Chhattisgarh. The airport is located at Mana, about 15 km (9.3 mi) south-east of Raipur and 10 km (6.2 mi) east of Naya Raipur. On 24 January 2012, the airport was renamed after Hindu monk and philosopher Swami Vivekananda, who spent his youth in Raipur between 1877 and 1879. Between April 2024 and March 2025, it handled around 2.6 million passengers, and is the busiest airport by passenger traffic in the state, and the second-busiest in Central India after Devi Ahilya Bai Holkar Airport in Indore.

== Infrastructure ==
The airport is spread over an area of 700 acres (280 ha). It has a single runway (06/24) measuring 3,250 m (10,660 ft) in length and 45 m (148 ft) in width. The runway was extended by 965 m (3,166 ft), which was operationalised on 8 August 2024. It is equipped with night landing facilities and a CAT II Instrument landing system, and other navigational aids such as Automatic Dependent Surveillance–Broadcast. The apron has eleven parking bays which can accommodate narrow body aircraft. The airport is equipped with category VI firefighting and rescue capability with provisions for category VII on demand.

=== Terminals ===
A new integrated passenger terminal was inaugurated on 7 November 2012. Built at a cost of about ₹1.65 billion (US$18 million), the building covers an area of 22,000 m^{2} (240,000 sq ft), and can handle 1300 passengers simultaneously, including 400 international passengers. The terminal has three jet bridges, eight boarding gates, twenty check-in counters, eight X-ray baggage machines, four security counters, and two conveyor belts for luggage.

Following the opening of the new passenger terminal, the old passenger terminal was converted to handle cargo operations. The domestic cargo terminal was inaugurated on 4 June 2016, which enabled to start air cargo operations at the airport.

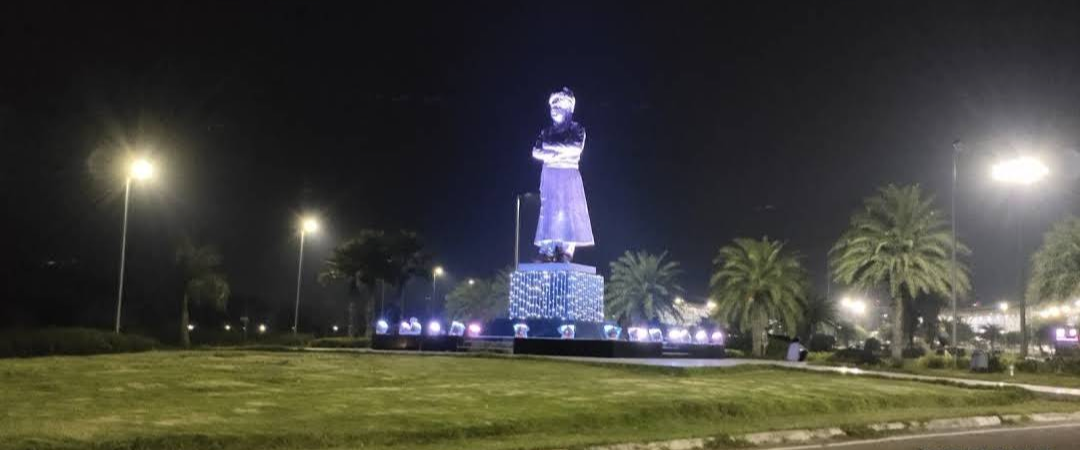
Swami Vivekananda's statue at the airport

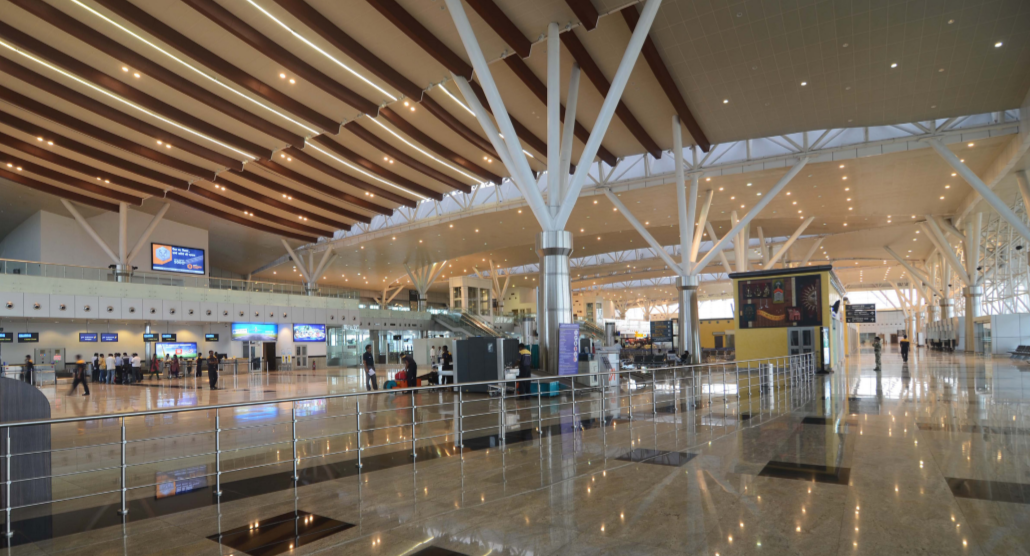
Terminal inside view

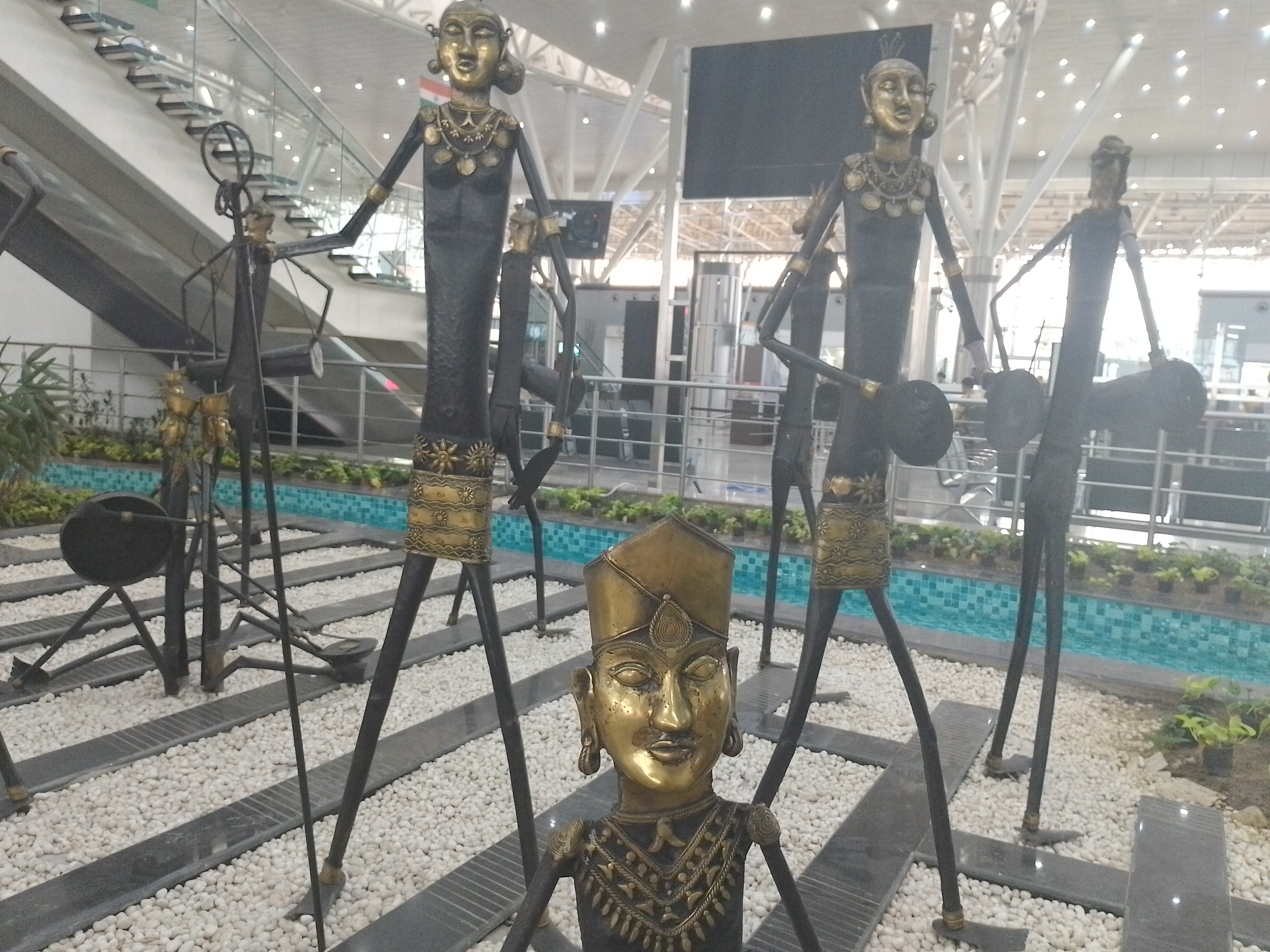
Tribal art Installation

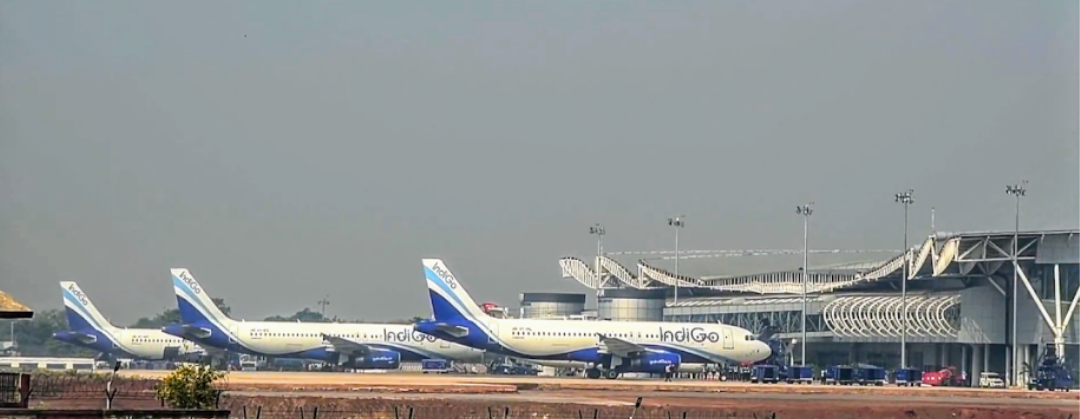
Aircraft at Apron

== Airlines and destinations ==
Airlines	Destinations
Air India	Delhi
Alliance Air	Ambikapur, Jagdalpur, Rewa
IndiGo	Ahmedabad, Bengaluru, Bhubaneswar, Bhopal, Chennai, Delhi, Goa–Dabolim, Hyderabad, Indore, Jagdalpur, Kolkata, Lucknow, Mumbai-Shivaji, Navi Mumbai, Pune

== Connectivity ==
The airport is located 16 km (9.9 mi) from Raipur Junction railway station and 17 km (11 mi) from the Inter State Bus Terminal in Raipur. It is serviced by the Raipur and Naya Raipur BRTS, and the Raipur Urban Public Transport Society operates air-conditioned buses to the neighbouring cities of Bhilai and Durg, via Raipur.

== Aerocity ==
In September 2023, foundation stone was laid for an aerocity near the airport, with plans to construct hotels, a convention center, shopping complexes, restaurants and entertainment facilities.
