= Atal Park =

Urban park in India

Coordinates: 21.1579°N 81.7837°E

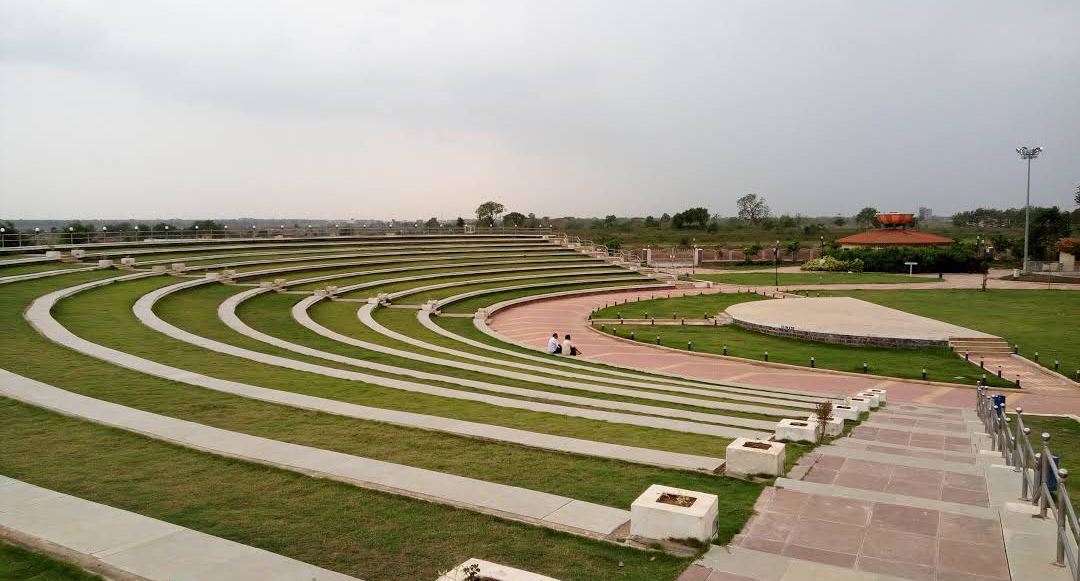
Central Park, Sector 24, Naya Raipur

Atal Park (formerly Central Park) is a public urban park located in Naya Raipur, the new capital of Chhattisgarh, India.

Central Park is located on Central Avenue Road on 35 acres of land. It has a 120-seater restaurant, an amphitheatre with a capacity of 1,500 people, mini markets, a yoga park, and an artificial lake built on the south side of the park. In the north, the park has a jogging track, multiplex theatre, restaurant, and playing area for children with 45 swings and an activity centre.

The park represents the rich art and heritage of the state. It was built at a cost of 70 crores by Naya Raipur Development Authority.
