= 85th plenary session of the Indian National Congress =

- Native name: 85वां महाधिवेशन
- Date: 24–26 February 2023
- Duration: Three days
- Venue: Rajyotsava Ground, Naya Raipur
- Location: Chhattisgarh, India
- Type: Plenary Session of the Indian National Congress
- Theme: Elect Congress Working Committee
- Organised by: All India Congress Committee

85th plenary session of the Indian National Congress was held from 24–26 February 2023 at the Rajyotsava Ground near Tuta in Naya Raipur, Chhattisgarh.
