= Purkhouti Muktangan =

Purkhouti Muktangan, Naya Raipur

- पुरखौती मुक्तांगन
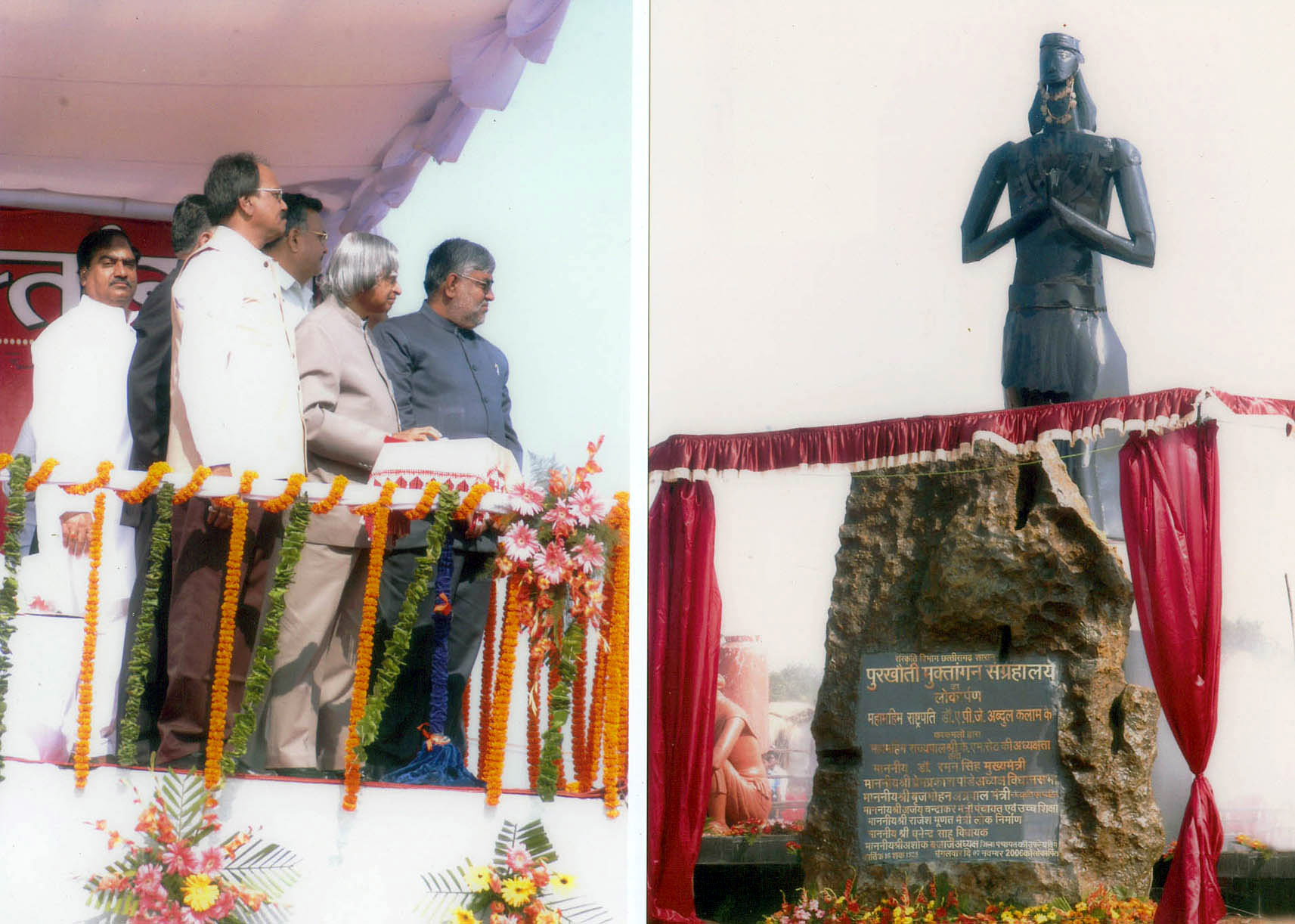
- Former President, Dr. A.P.J. Abdul Kalam inaugurating the Purkhouti Muktangan in 2006
- Interactive map of Purkhouti Muktangan
- Type: Sculpture garden
- Location: Sector 24 Naya Raipur, Chhattisgarh, India
- Coordinates: 21.134°N 81.759°E
- Area: 24.2 hectares (60 acres)
- Opened: November 2006
- Founder: Government of Chhattisgarh
- Owner: Chhattisgarh Tourism Department
- Operator: Cultural Department of Government of Chhattisgarh
- Public transit: Raipur and Naya Raipur Bus Rapid Transit System

Purkhouti Muktangan is a 24.2-hectare (60-acre) cultural and sculpture garden in Naya Raipur, Chhattisgarh, India.

Established in 2006 and inaugurated by former President A. P. J. Abdul Kalam, it offers a glimpse into the Chhattisgarh culture through its display of the habitat, artifacts, art, folk dances, and food habits of the state's tribal communities.

== Gallery ==
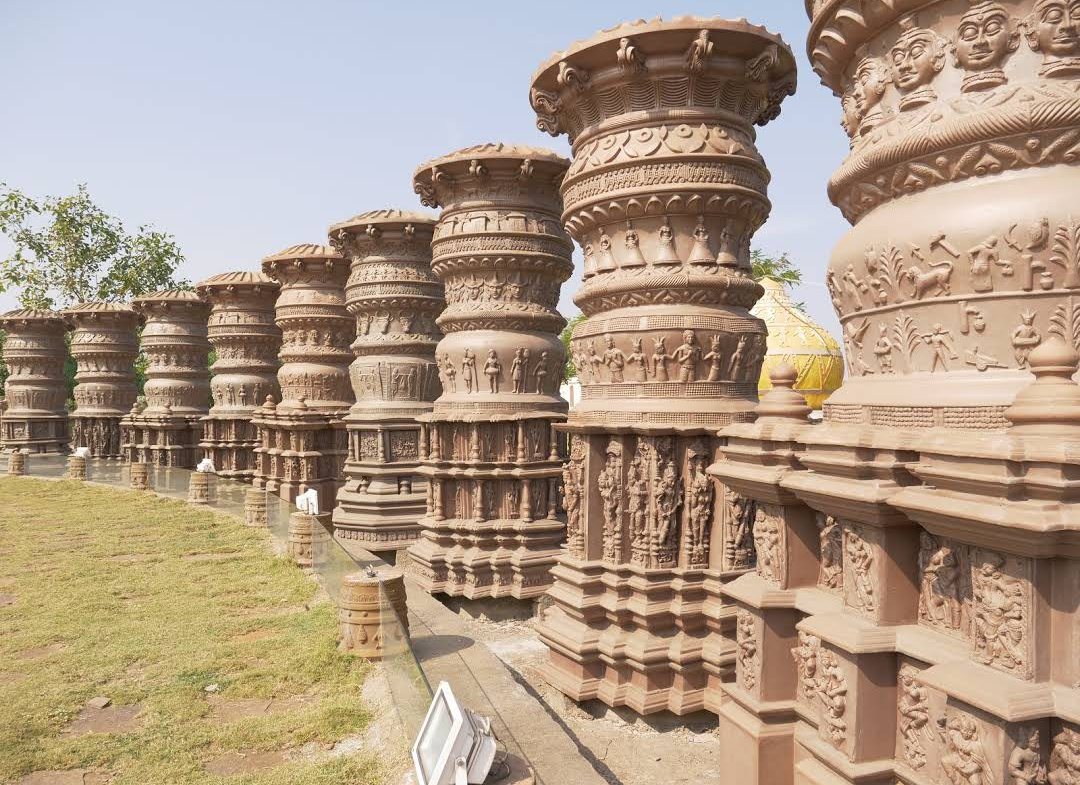
Art showing pillars

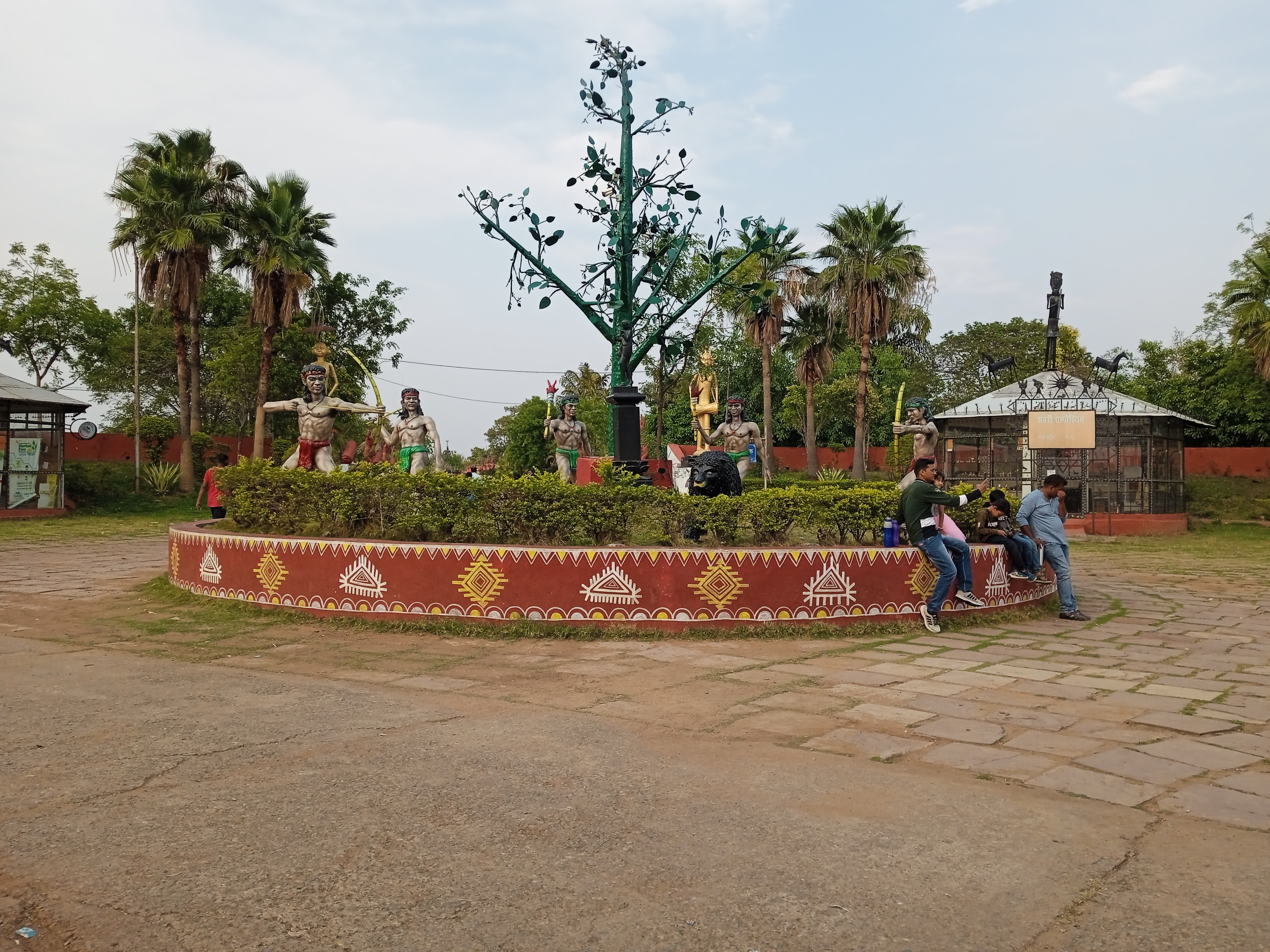
Near entrance

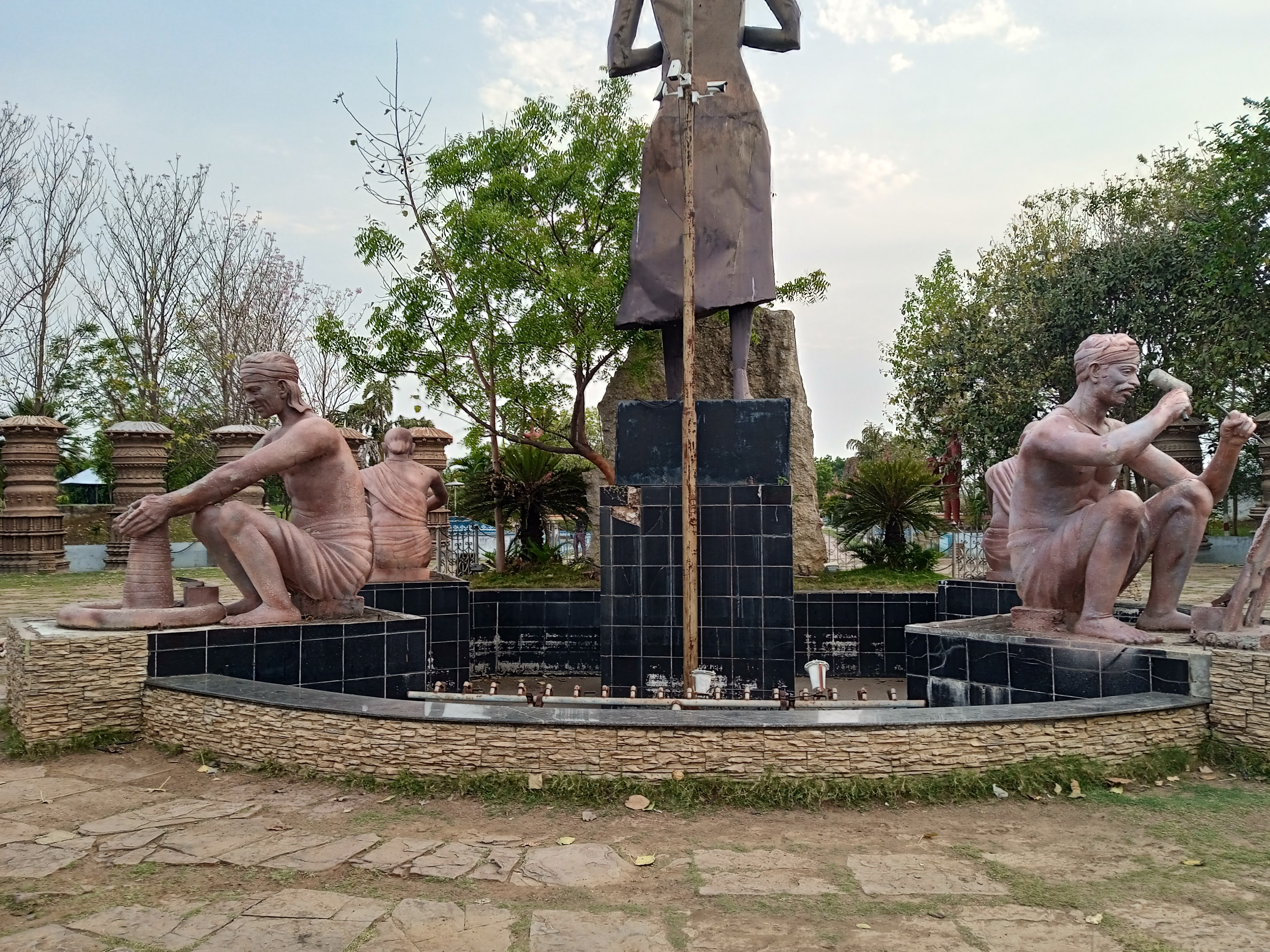
Statues

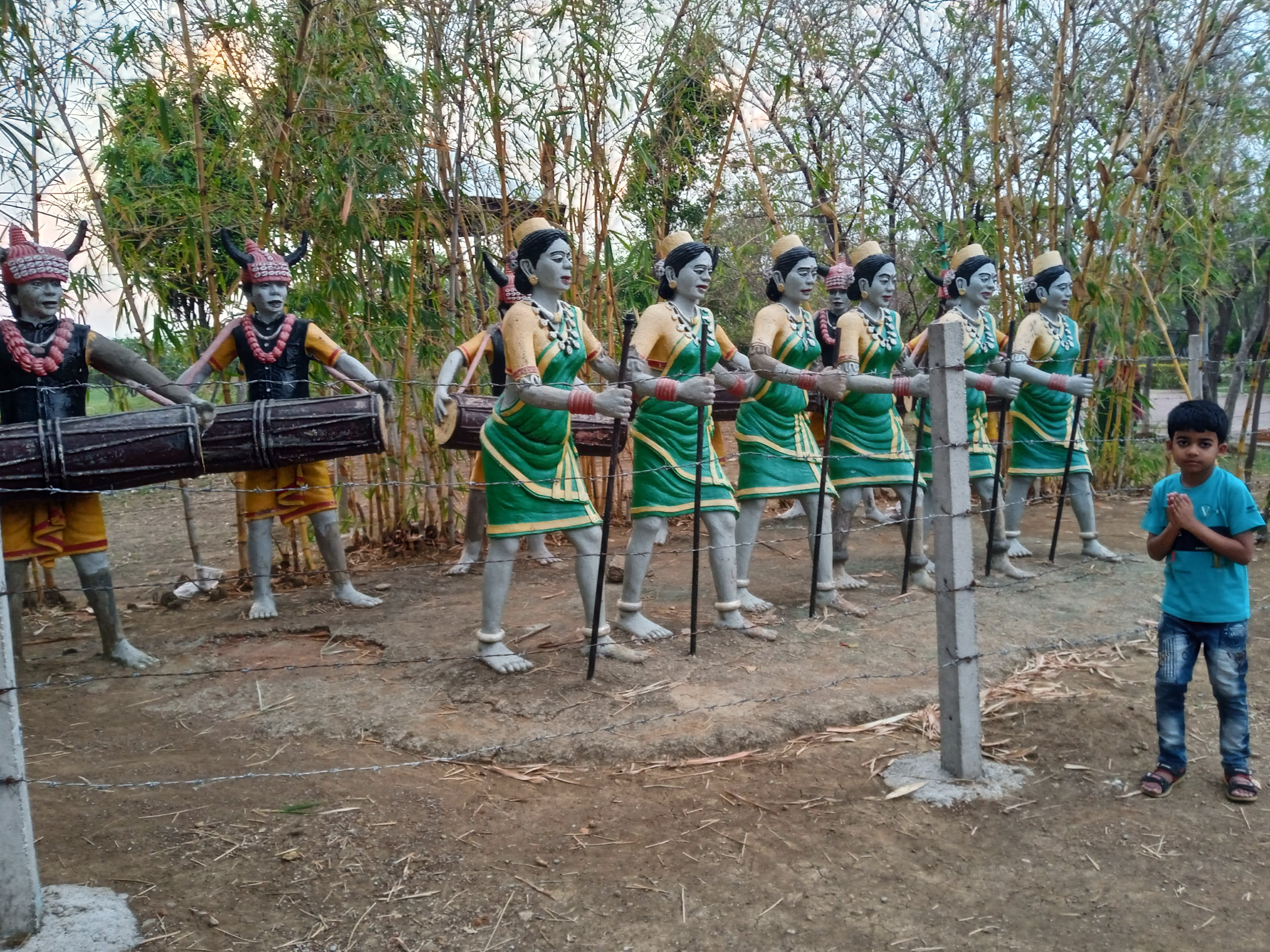
Statues

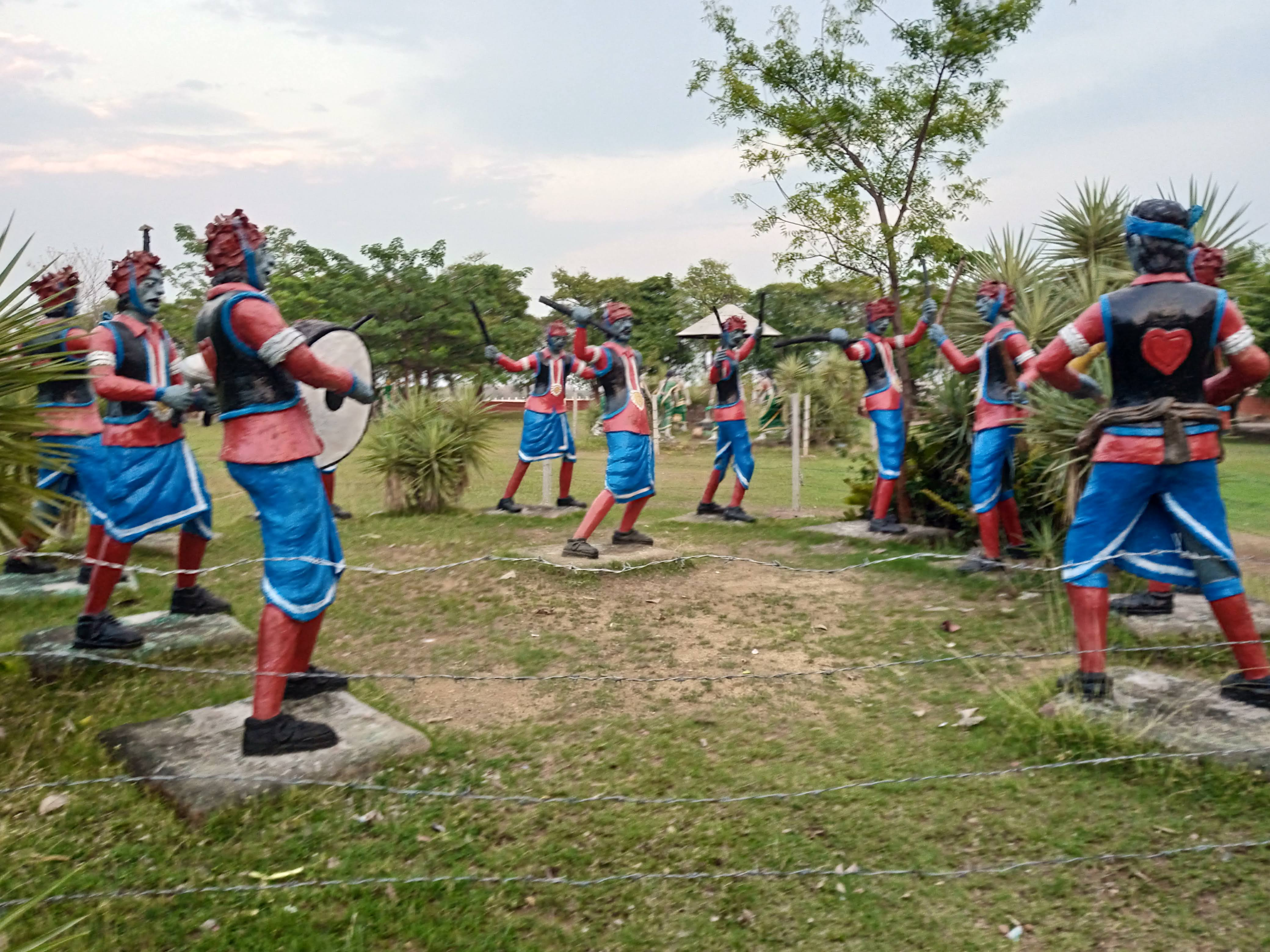
Statues

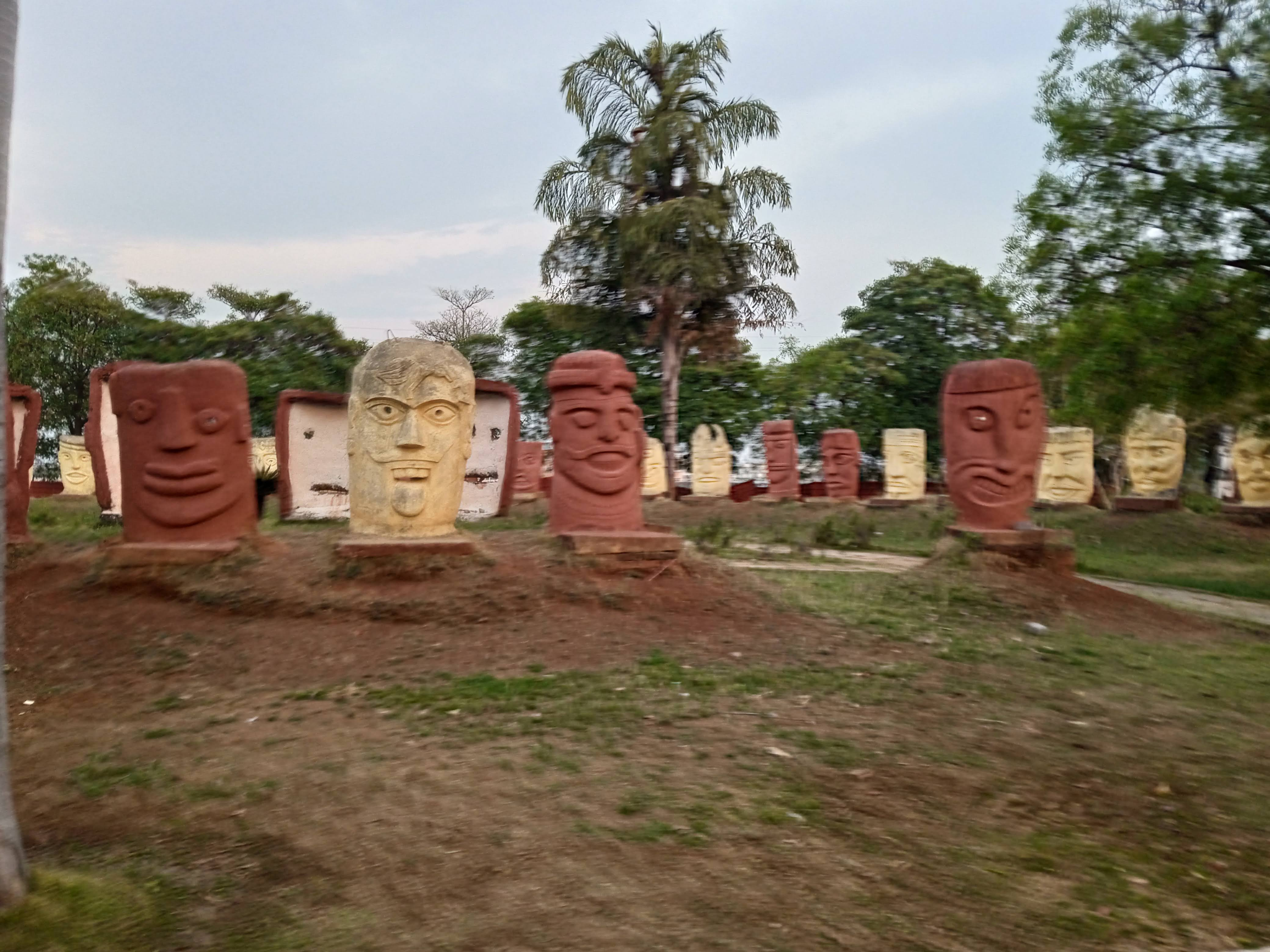
Statues of faces

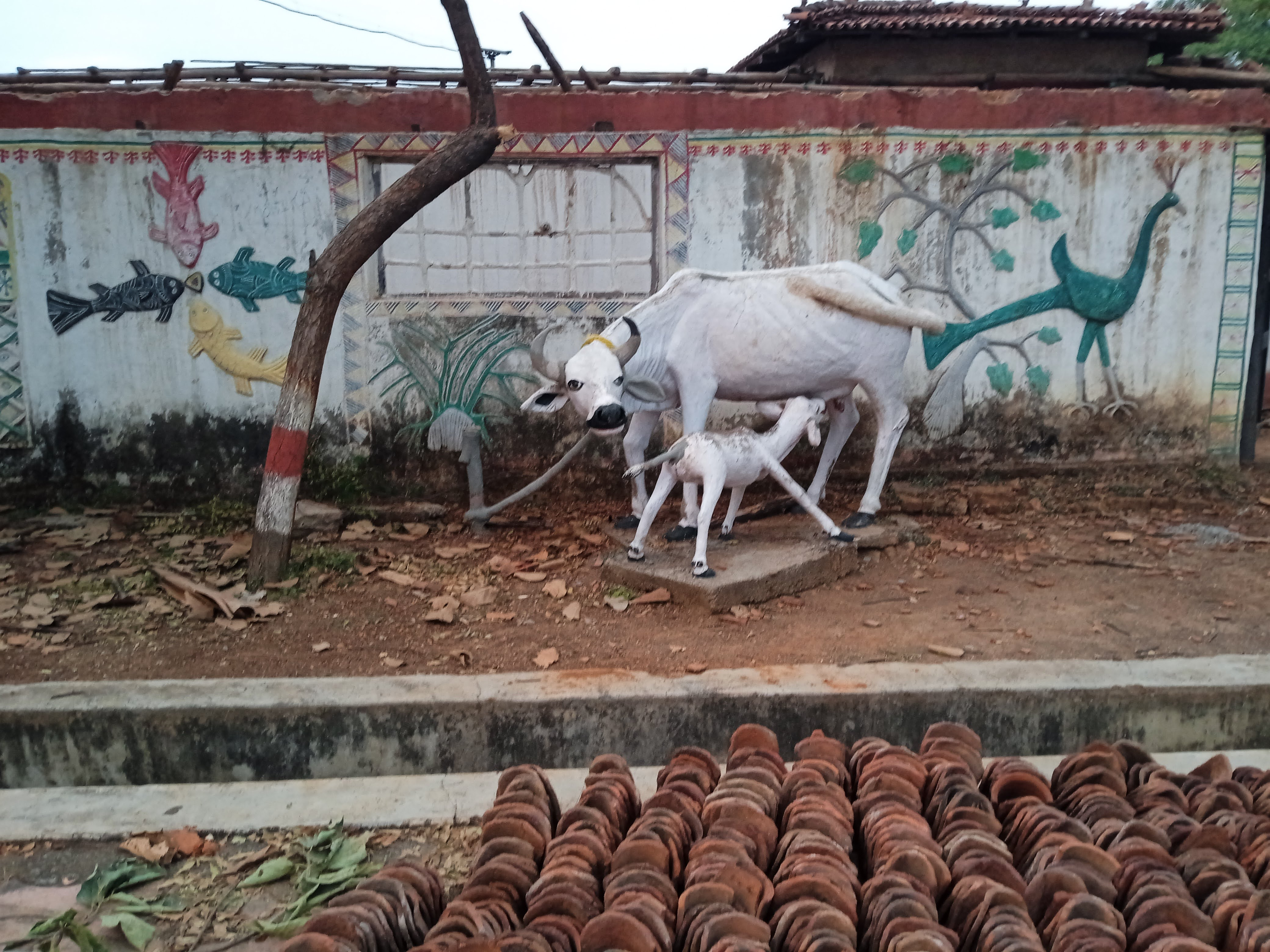
Statue of a cow

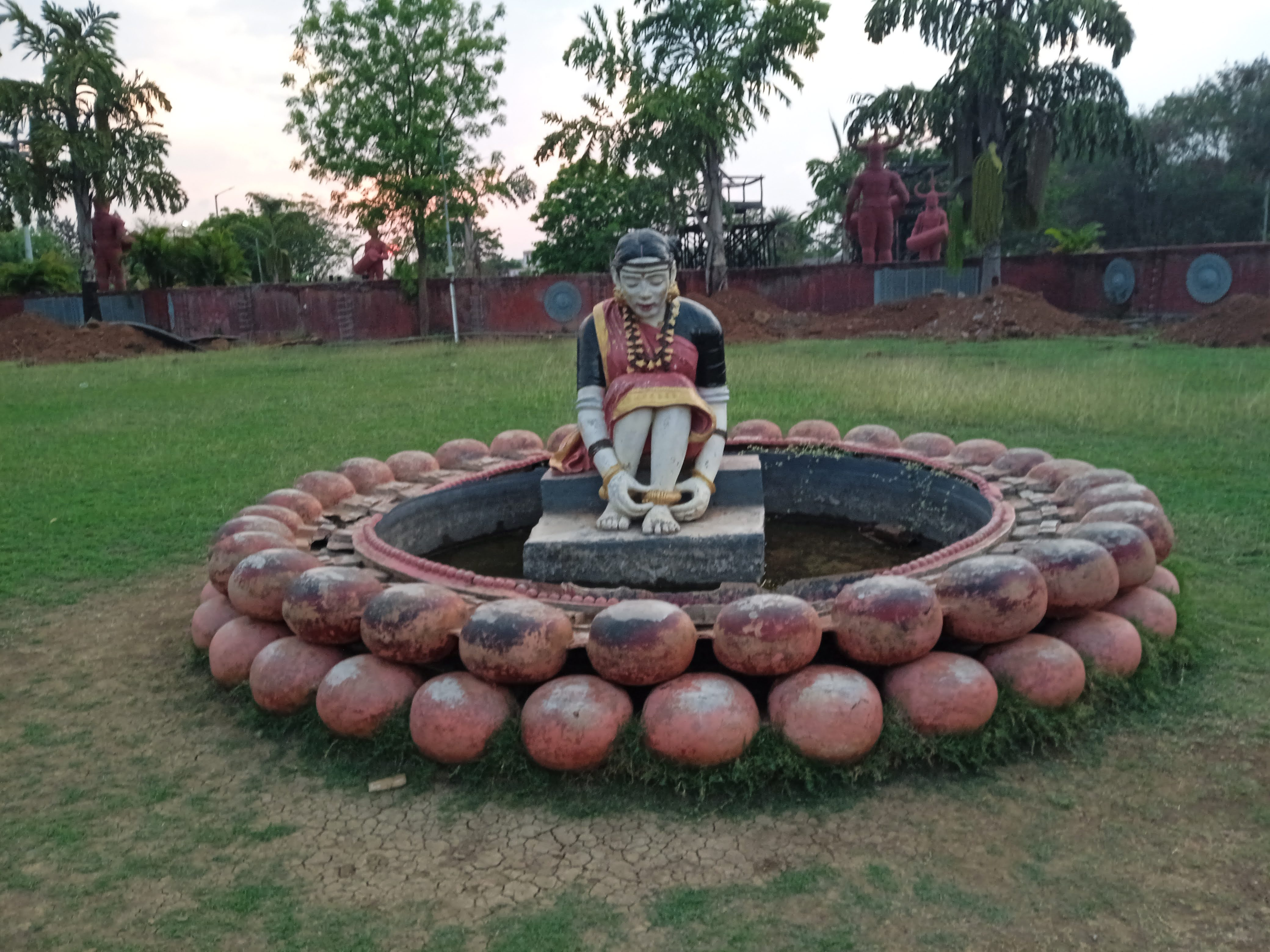
Statue of a woman

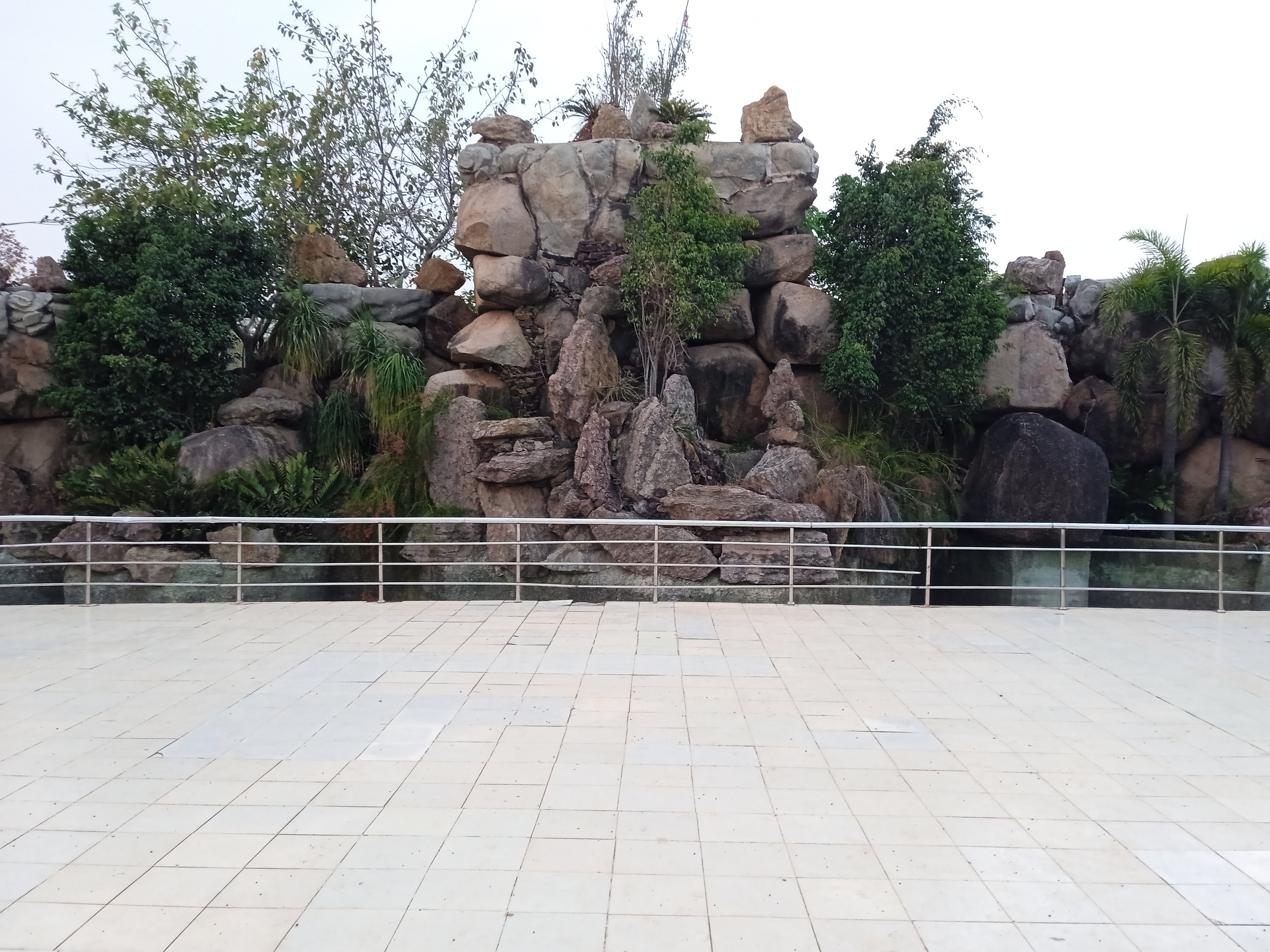
Design made from rocks

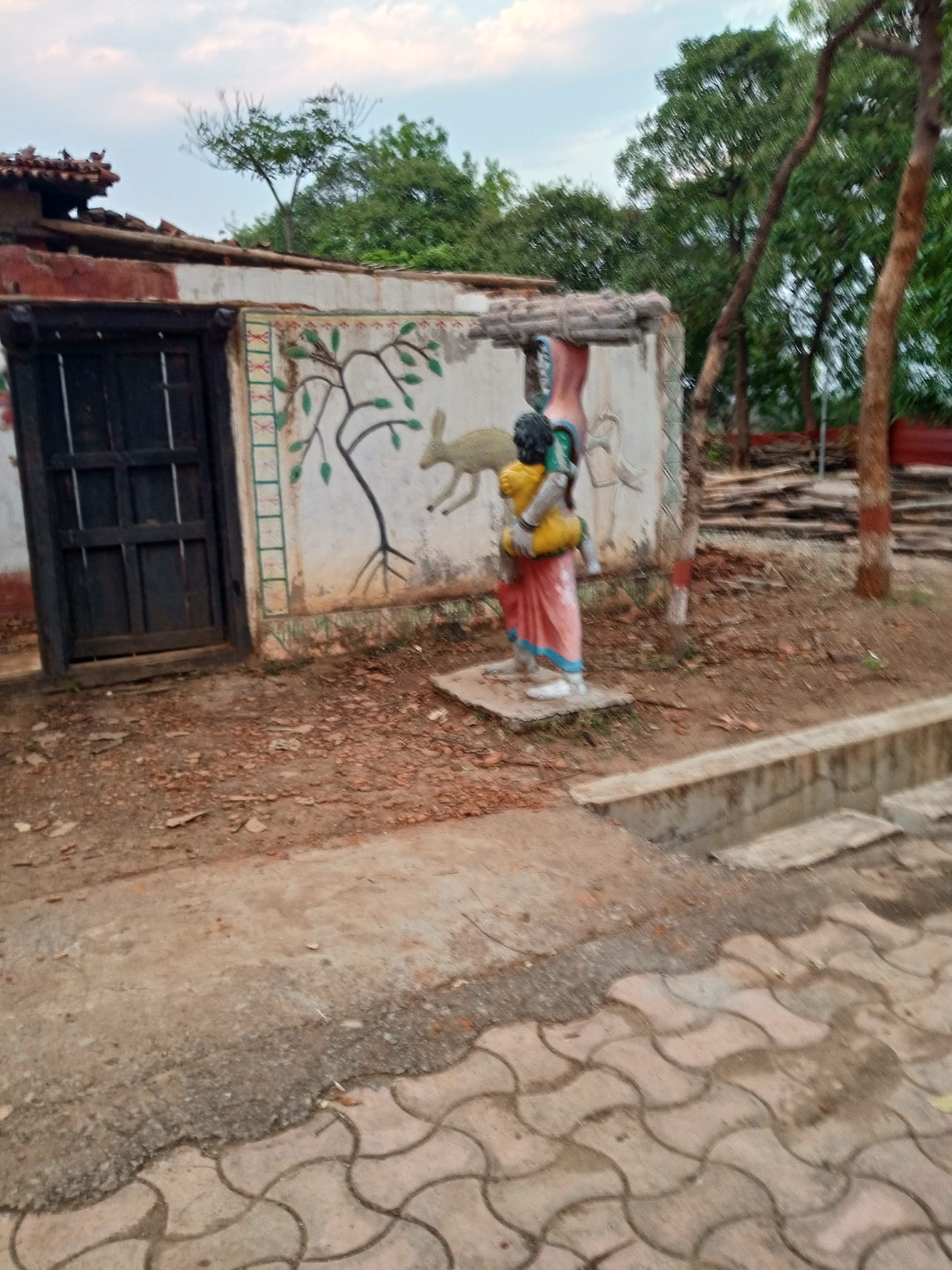
