= Nava Raipur Atal Nagar Vikas Pradhikaran =

Urban planning agency in Chhattisgarh

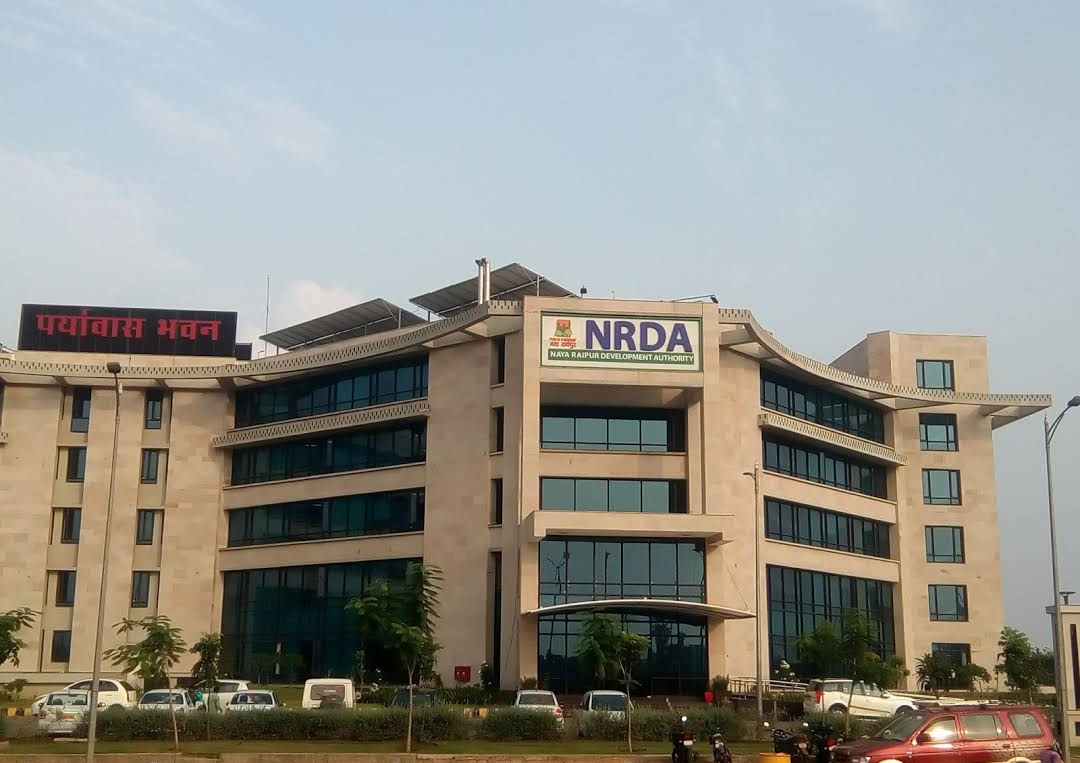
- Utility Block, Capitol Complex, Sector- 19, Naya Raipur.

State agency overview
- Type: Urban planning
- Jurisdiction: Government of Chhattisgarh
- Headquarters: Naya Raipur, Chhattisgarh, India
- Motto: Green and Smart City
- Minister responsible: Vishnudeo Sai, Chief Minister of Chhattisgarh
- State agency executive: Neelam Namdeo Ekka, IAS (Promoted), CEO
- Parent department: Government of Chhattisgarh
- Website: navaraipuratalnagar.com

Nava Raipur Atal Nagar Vikas Pradhikaran (ANVP) is the urban planning agency serving Atal Nagar Metropolitan Region of the Indian state of Chhattisgarh. It was established under the Chhattisgarh Nagar Tatha Gram Nivesh Adhiniyam, 1973. The headquarters of the authority is 7, Utility Block, Capitol Complex, Sector- 19, Atal Nagar.

== Departments ==
The authority is divided into the twelve departments.

1. Engineering
2. Finance
3. Town planning
4. Architecture
5. Legal
6. Monitoring
7. Enforcement
8. Vigilance
9. Establishment and Authority
10. Policy
11. Land acquisition
12. Information technology

== See also ==
- Urban planning
