= Raipur Metropolitan Region =

- Metropolitan Area
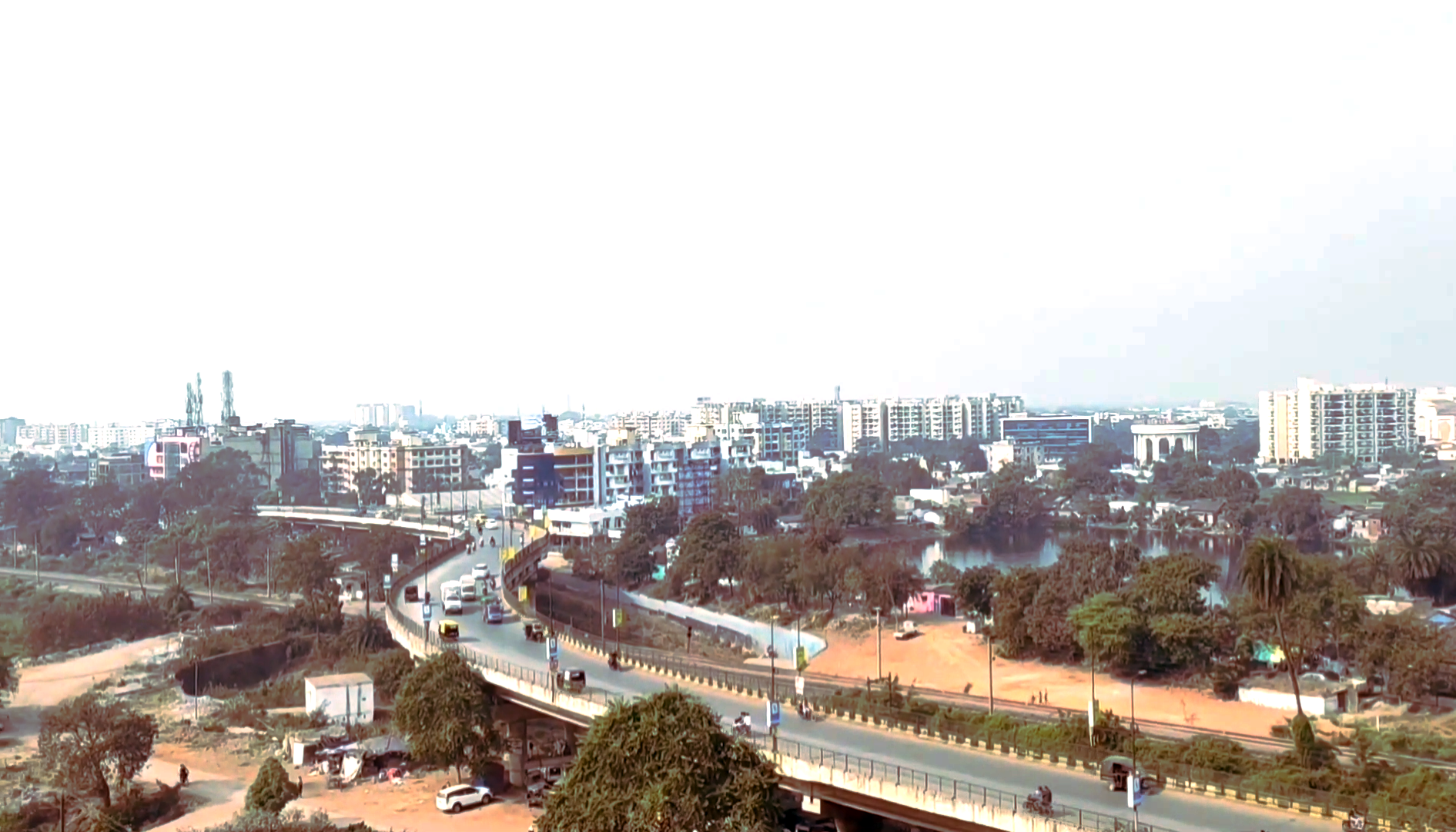
- Country: India
- State: Chhattisgarh
- District: Raipur, Durg

Area
  - Metro: 800.02 km^{2} (308.89 sq mi)

Population (2011 Census)
  - Metro: 2,343,334
  - Metro density: 2,929.1/km^{2} (7,586.3/sq mi)
- Time zone: UTC+5.30 (IST)

Raipur Metropolitan Region, also known as the Raipur Metropolitan Area and Greater Raipur, is the Urban Agglomeration of Raipur-Naya Raipur and some part of Durg Bhilai in the Indian state of Chhattisgarh. The area is administered by the Raipur Development Authority, Raipur Municipal Corporation, Nava Raipur Vikas Pradikaran, Birgaon Municipal Corporation, Bhilai-Charoda Municipal Corporation, Risali Municipal Corporation, Durg Municipal Corporation and numerous smaller urban bodies.

== Demographics ==
According to the 2011 census data, the total population of the Raipur metropolitan region was 2,343,334 that includes population of Raipur-Bhilai-Durg. Its total urban area is 800.02 km^{2}.

== See also ==
- Raipur District
- Durg District
