= Nava Raipur =

City in India

- Planned City, Greenfield City
- Atal Nagar
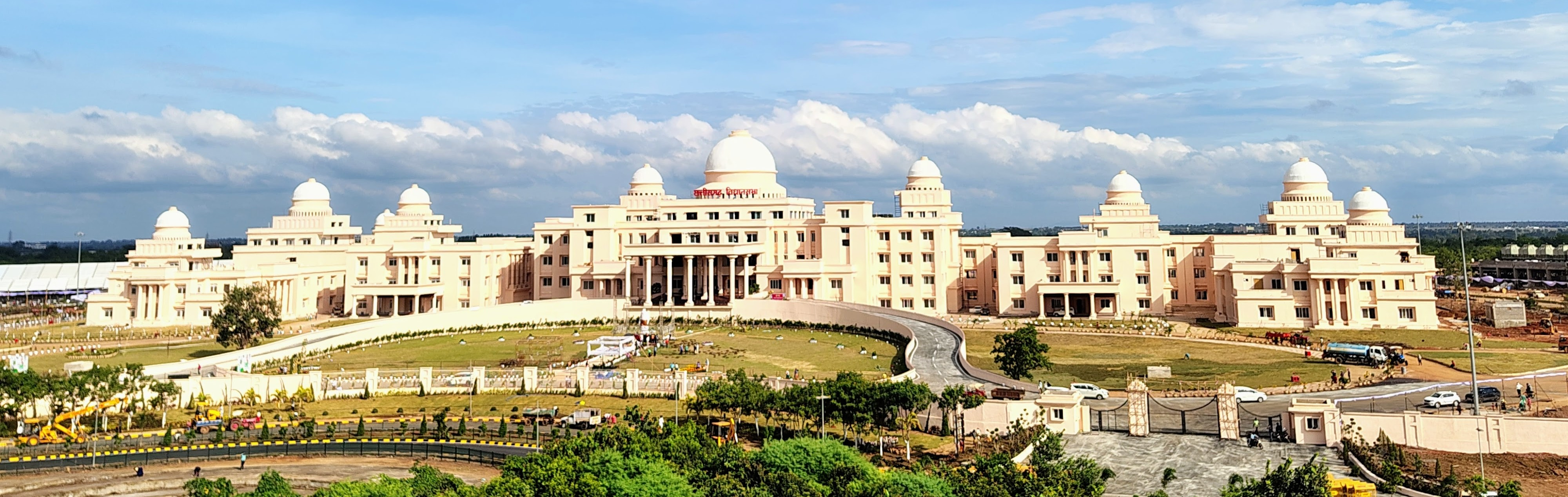
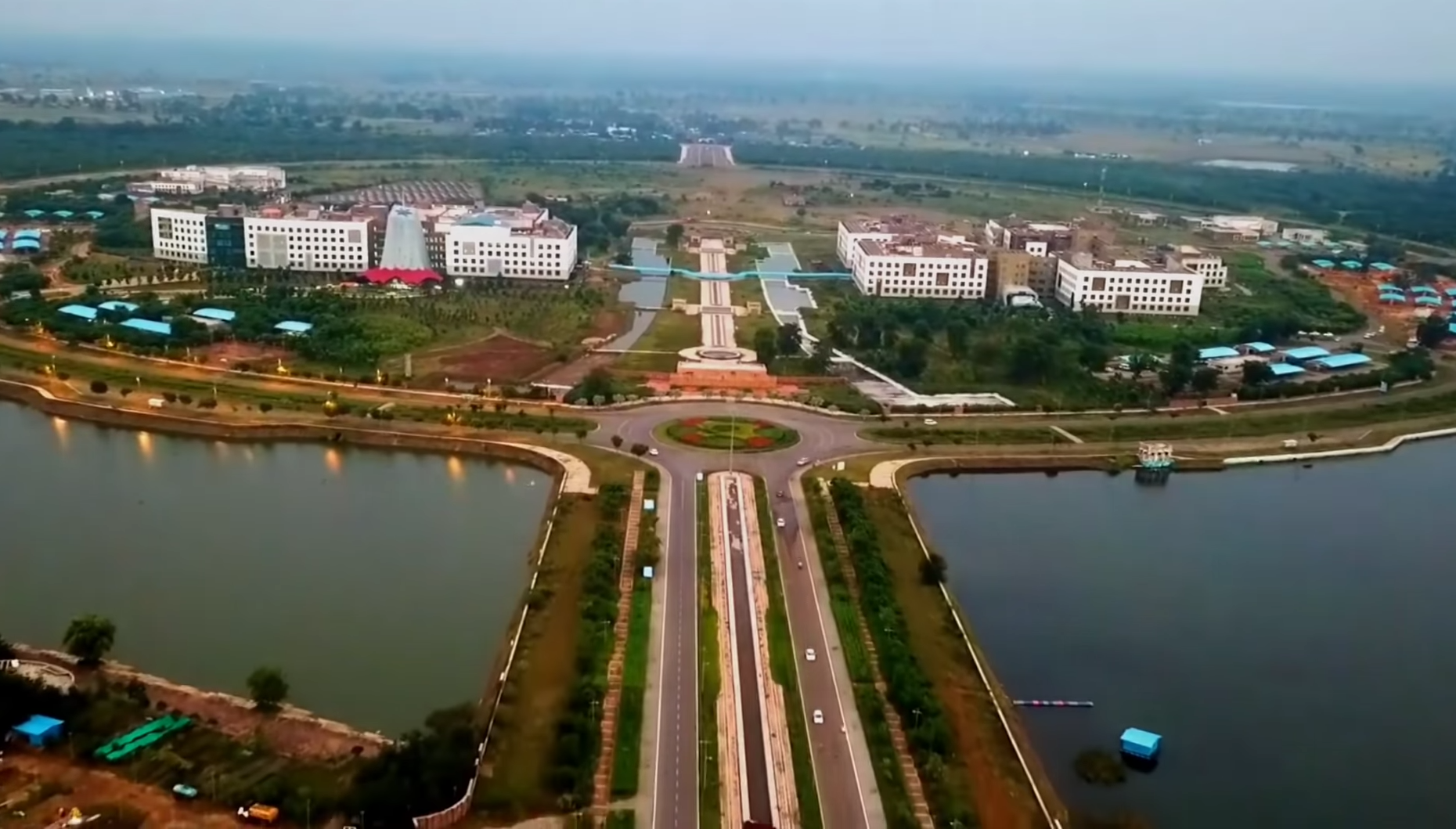
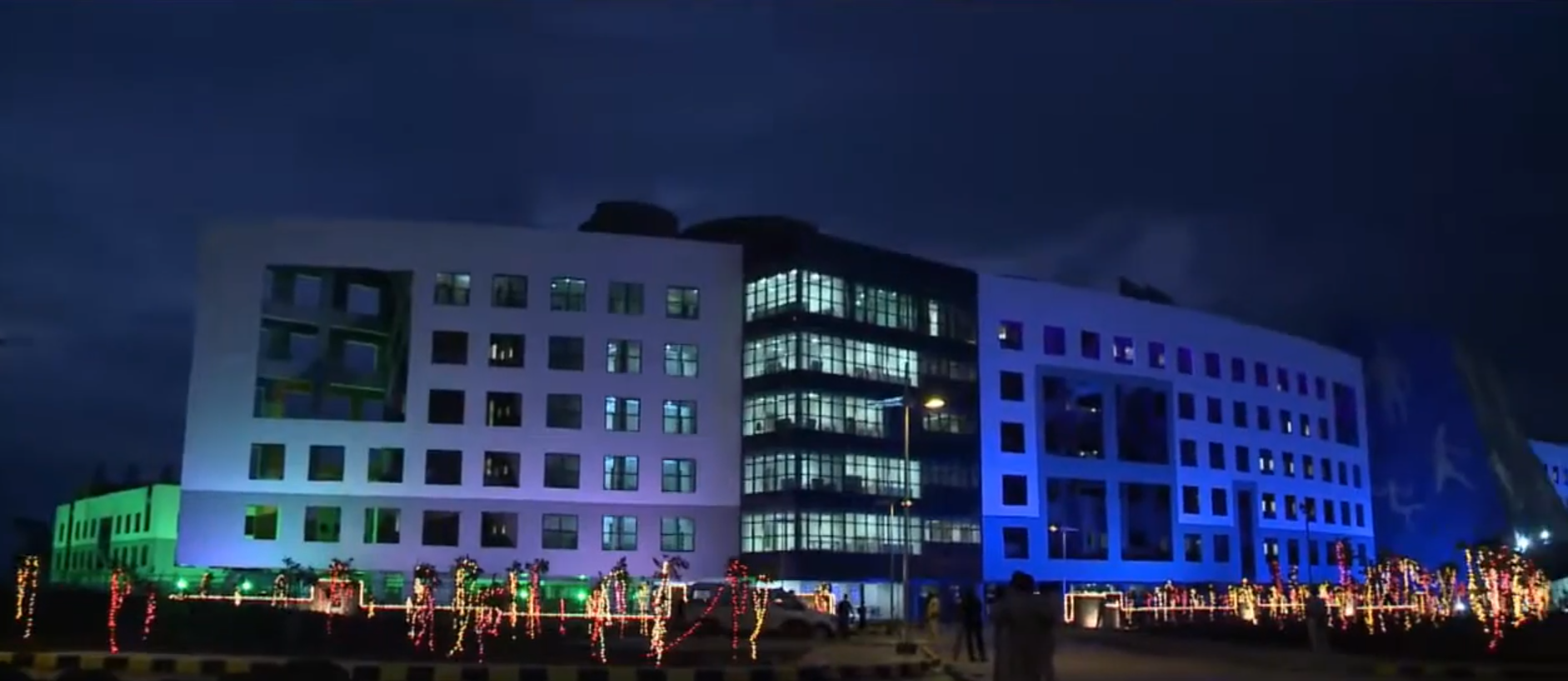
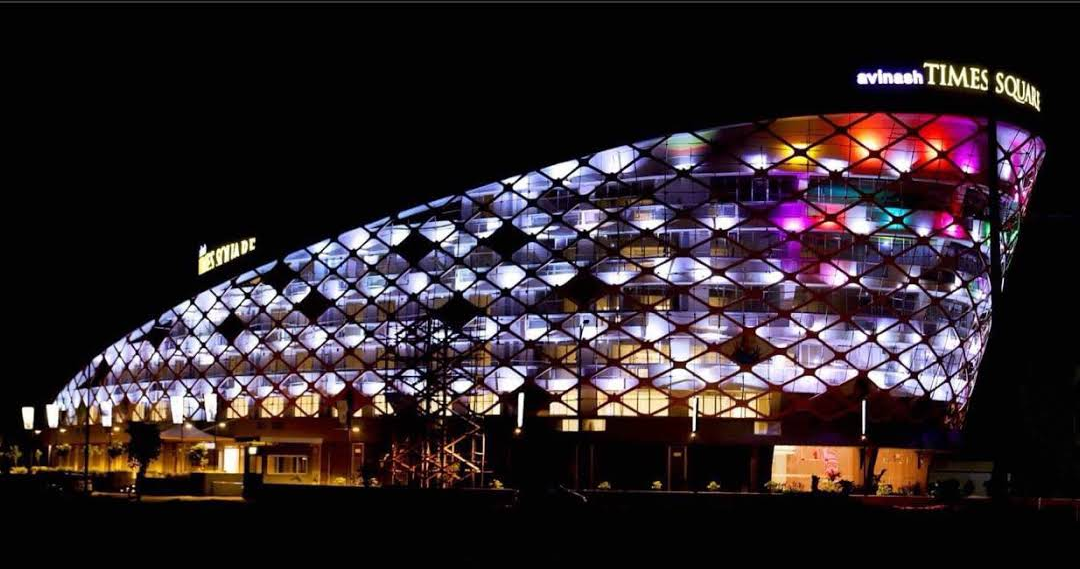
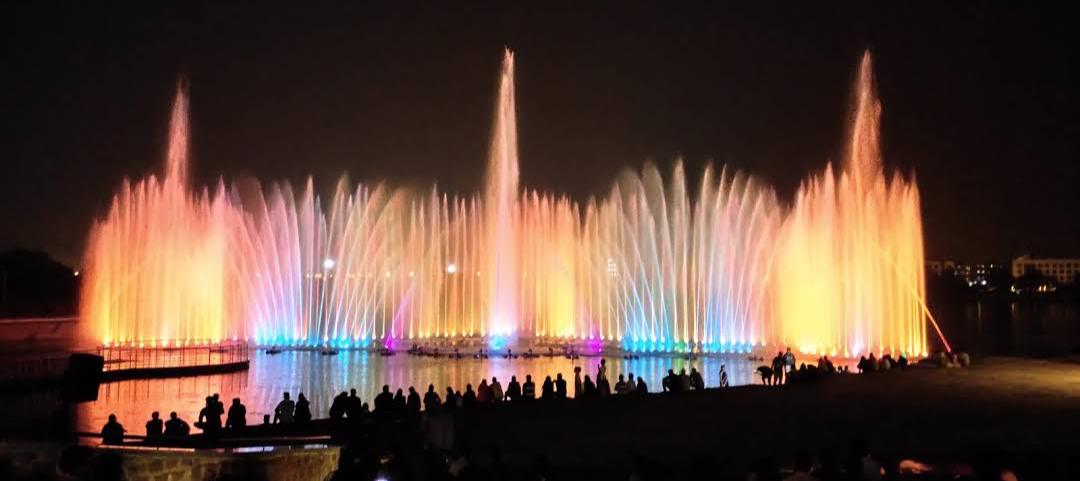
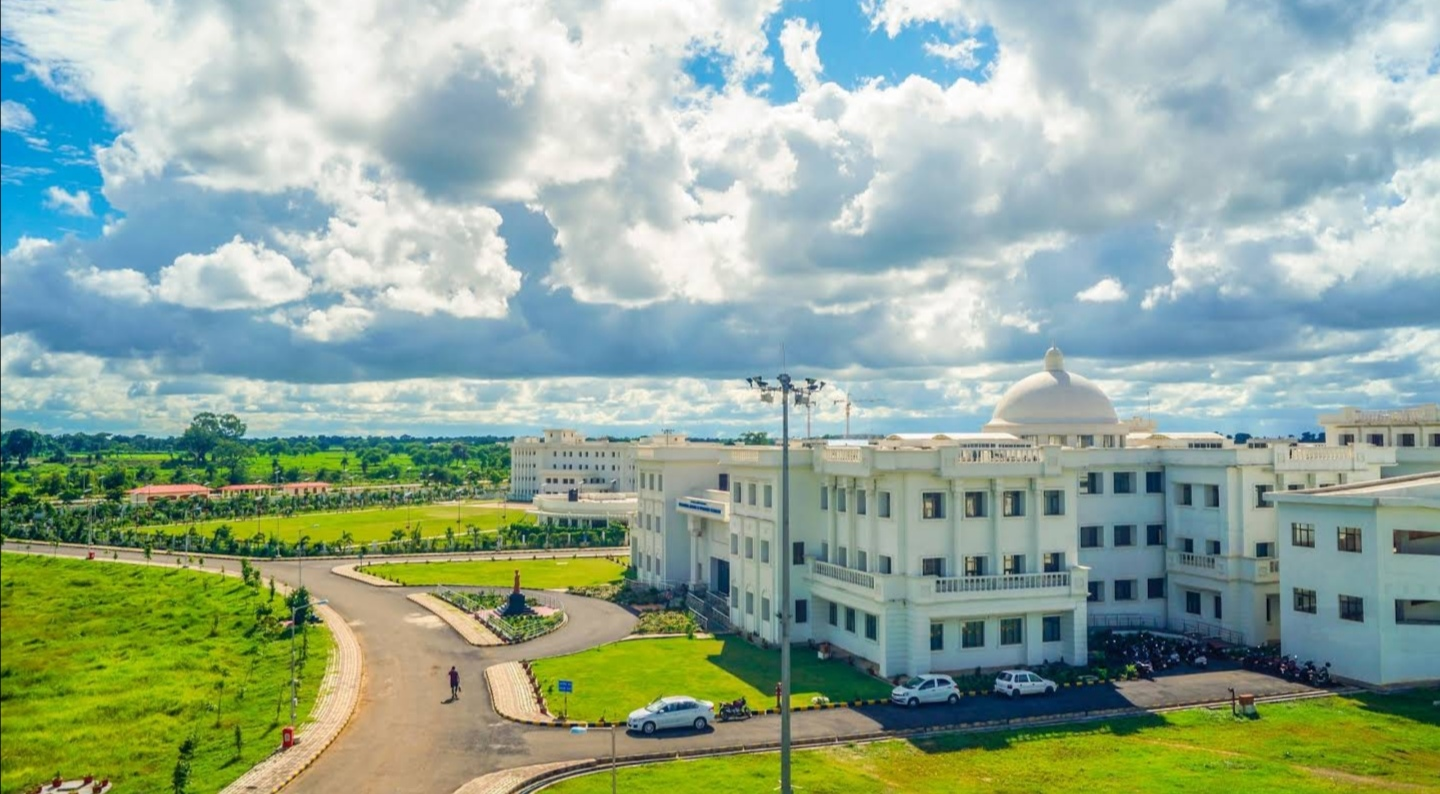
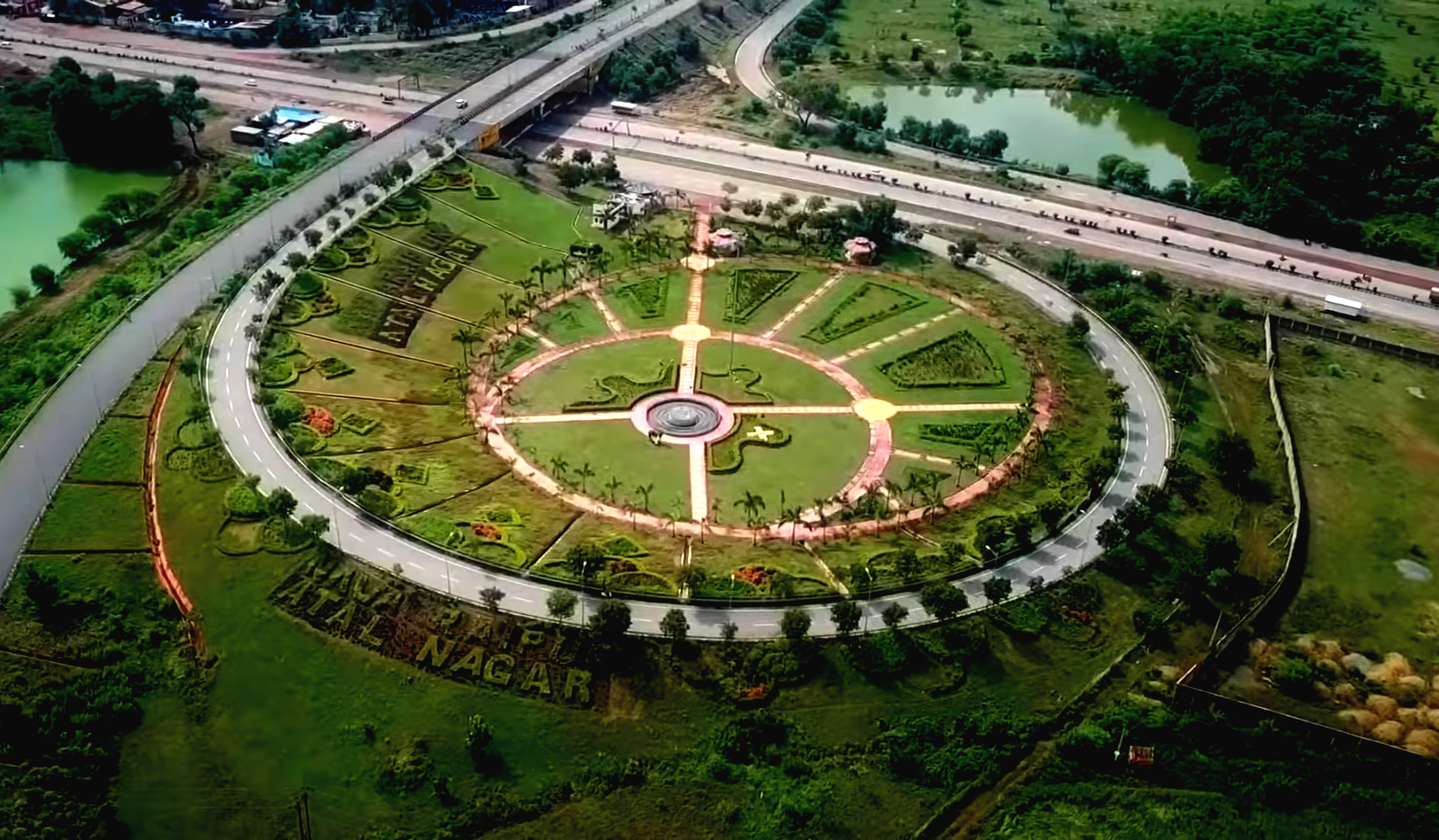
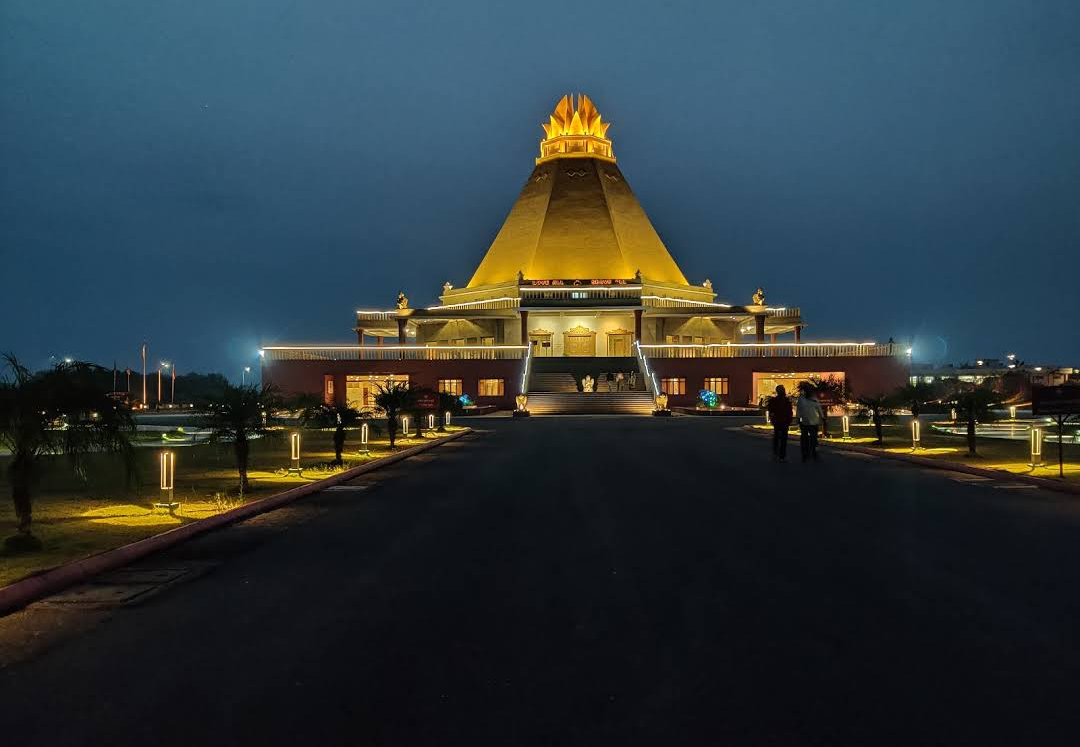
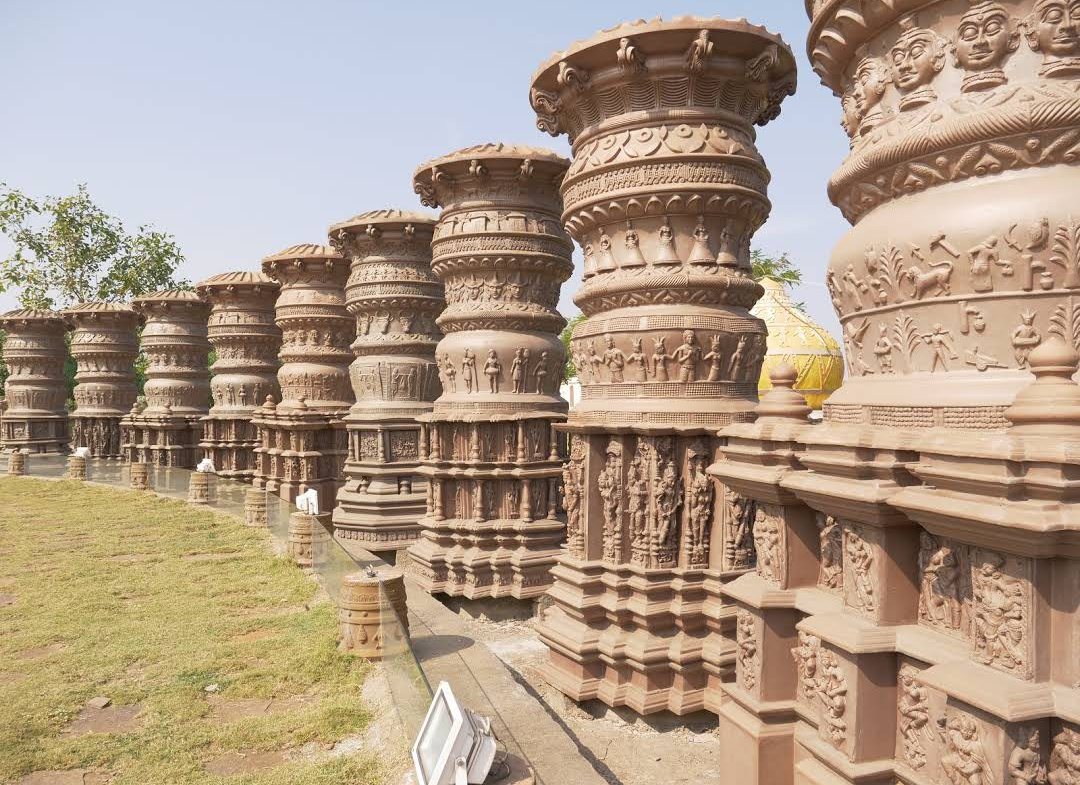
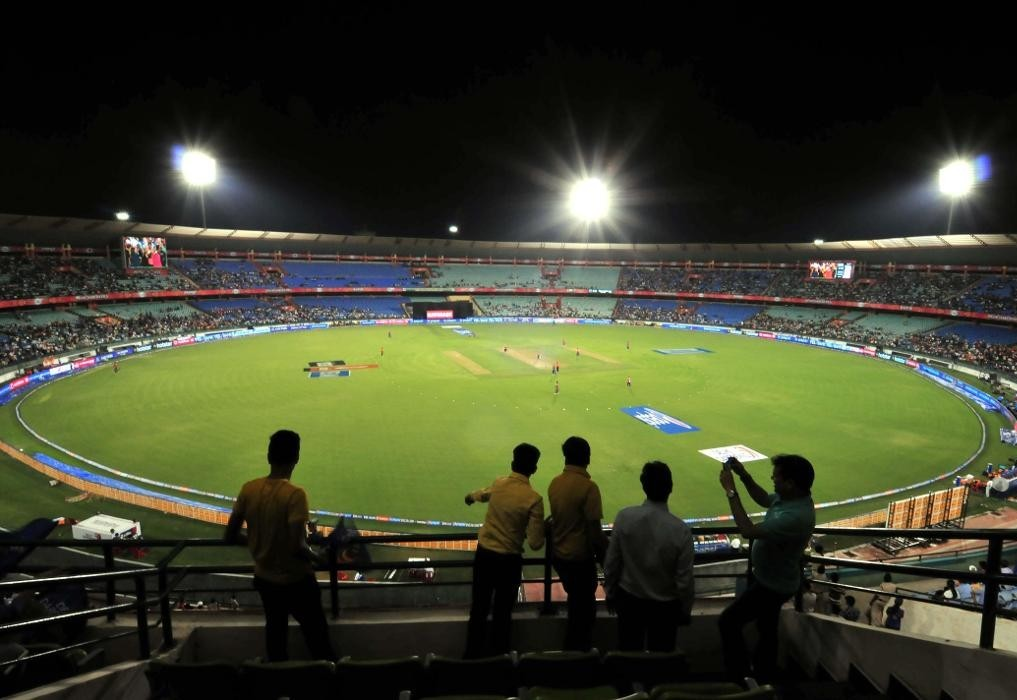
- Vidhan Bhavan Capitol complex Secretariat Chhattisgarh Avinash Times Square Mall Musical Fountain IIIT Naya Raipur Swagat Vatika Cloverleaf Interchange Satya Sai Mandir Purkhouti Muktangan Nava Raipur stadium
- Interactive map of Naya Raipur
- Location in Chhattisgarh, India Nava Raipur (India)
- Coordinates: 21.161°N 81.787°E
- Country: India
- State: Chhattisgarh
- District: Raipur
- Established: 2000
- Founder: Raman Singh
- Named for: Atal Bihari Vajpayee; Brahma Deo Rai

Government
  - Body: Nava Raipur Atal Nagar Vikas Pradhikaran
  - Member of Parliament: Brijmohan Agrawal, BJP (Raipur)
  - Member of Legislative Assembly: Guru Khushwant Saheb, BJP (Arang)

Population
  - Total: 560,000

Languages
  - Official: Hindi
- Time zone: UTC+5:30 (IST)
- Postal code: 492101
- Telephone code: +91-0771
- Vehicle registration: CG 04
- Railway station: CBD Naya Raipur (CBDNR)
- Nearest city: Raipur, Bhilai, Durg
- Civic agency: Nava Raipur Atal Nagar Vikas Pradhikaran
- Airport: Swami Vivekananda Airport (RPR)
- Website: navaraipuratalnagar.com

Nava Raipur, officially known as Atal Nagar-Nava Raipur, is a planned city and fully Greenfield city in Indian state of Chhattisgarh. It is planned to replace Raipur as the capital city of Chhattisgarh. The Government of Chhattisgarh, the state's administrative body is situated here. The city is located between National Highway 53 and National Highway 30, about 17 km south-east of the capital city Raipur. Swami Vivekananda Airport separates Raipur and Nava Raipur.

== Nava Raipur Development Authority ==
After the formation of the new state of Chhattisgarh in November 2000, the state government decided to create a well planned new city for Raipur. Hence a special area has been notified under section 64 of Nagar Tatha Gramnivesh Adhiniyam 1973.

The authority thus formed is the Capital Area Development Authority (CADA) which is now called the Nava Raipur Atal Nagar Vikas Pradhikaran (NRDA). NRDA is the nodal agency undertaking comprehensive development of this 'greenfield' city.

Chief executive officers are appointed by government and other officers and staff working under NRDA organisation. Indian Administrative Service (IAS) officer P. Joy Oommen is the chairman of the NRDA, while S.S. Bajaj is its chief executive.

== Economic base ==
The main activity base of Nava Raipur would be the government/state capital functions. However, a diversification of economy is desirable, which would be attained through the following activities:

- Software technology park
- Gems, jewellery and other similar industries
- Business offices
- Health, education and research services
- Regional recreational activities
- Nandan Van Zoo & Safari
- International cricket stadium
- 5 star hotels
- 18 hole golf course and golf villas
- Museums
- Art gallery and library
- Garden
- Botanical garden
- Lakes
- Film City

== Planning methodology ==
While venturing to prepare the development plan for Nava Raipur, basic studies were made in the form of a secondary survey of data on Chandigarh (the first planned capital of a state in independent India) and Raipur, the elder sister and the most important "organic" metropolis in the region.

The space quantum against each activity/work-centre was then ascertained going by the accepted thumb-rule of the concerned industry/trade/activity, to the case of capital complex, and exact figures of government jobs were taken into consideration. The resultant space quantum was then allocated on two-dimension on the structure plan and final quantum, shape, location, was defined by exact boundaries/roads on the plan.

With iterations, the allocated spaces were again translated in terms of number of jobs and the total number of job in the city arrived at. With a population of 5.6 lakhs, the Nava Raipur City will be expected to generate approximately 2.2 lakh jobs, with an assumed workforce participation rate of 40%. The high standards of physical and social infrastructure adopted for the city will be able to cope with the maximum capacity of the city.

== Smart city infrastructure ==
Nava Raipur is designed as a "zero discharge city" that recycles its water waste for non-potable uses. The city's utility network is managed through an integrated Command and Control Center (ICCC), which uses SCADA technology to provide real time monitoring of electricity and water distribution systems.

== Education ==
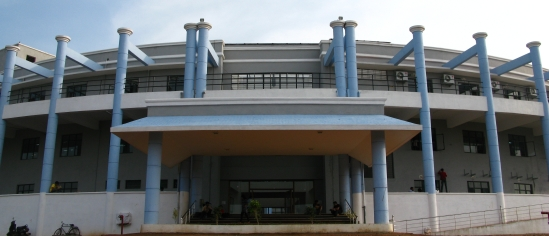
Hidayatullah National Law University

Nava Raipur will form the hub of educational institutions in the state. The city will have premier educational institutions shifted from Raipur. A few of them are:

- Hidayatullah National Law University
- National Institute of Technology, Raipur
- International Institute of Information Technology
- Indian Institute of Management, Raipur

The state government is planning to develop a science city in Nava Raipur.

== Transportation ==
=== Roadways ===
Nava Raipur has an entirely planned road network within the city premises, and is having good connectivity with Raipur and the rest of the state, with the help of national and state highways. Some of the major roads are Raipur–Naya Raipur Expressway, or the Atal Path Expressway, which directly connects the city with Raipur railway station, National Highway 30 (NH-30 as a secondary highway to Raipur and National Highway 53 (NH-53), which passes through just north of the city.

The proposed Durg–Raipur–Arang Expressway will pass through the southern limits of the city, and the under-construction Raipur–Visakhapatnam Expressway will start from Kurud, which is 41 km (25 mi) south of the city, and could be accessed with the help of NH-30. Once both the expressways are completed, it will help the city by enhancing connectivity and commute with the state, as well as with the rest of the country.

=== Rail ===
There are two small railway stations in proximity to the city, and the main and nearest railway station is the Nava Raipur Railway Station or Atal Nagar Railway Station, which is located 11 km (6.8 mi) north of the city, lying on the Howrah–Nagpur–Mumbai line passing through the northern limits of the city. The major railway stations are Raipur Junction railway station, 25 km (16 mi) and Arang Mahanadi railway station located at Arang, 24 km (15 mi) from Nava Raipur, respectively.

To the east of the airport, in the Central Business District, a bypass line has been made to connect the city directly by making a new, major railway station for Nava Raipur. It is named as the CBD Railway Station, and is under construction. Once completed, it will become the main railway station for the city.

=== Bus transport ===
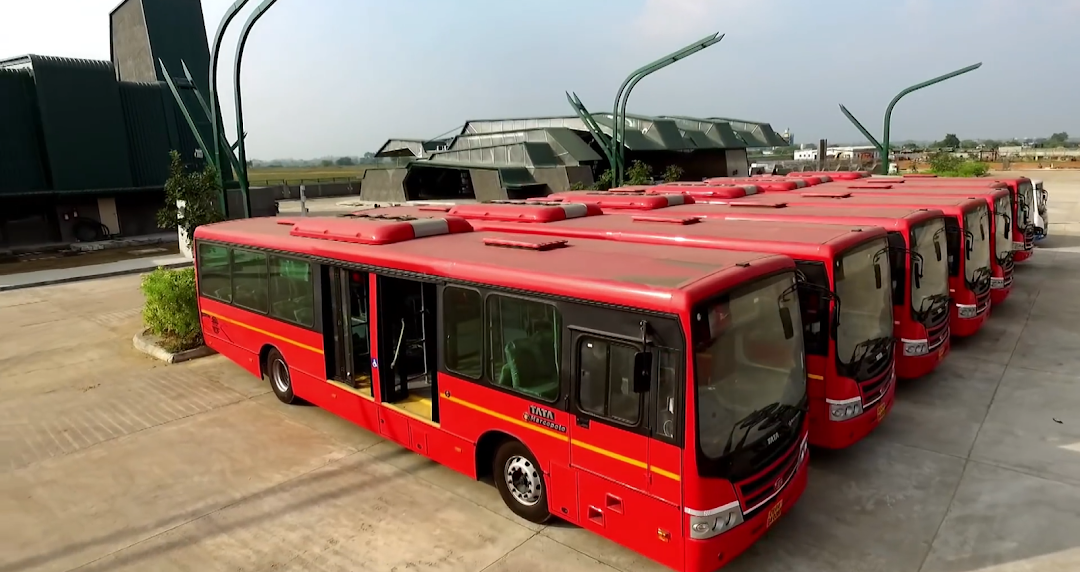
Raipur and Naya Raipur Bus Rapid Transit System

Regular bus services are operated by the Nava Raipur Atal Nagar Vikas Pradhikaran, government and private operators from the main bus station of Nava Raipur Bus Station, and along with these services, the Raipur and Naya Raipur Bus Rapid Transit System also connects the city with Raipur. The BRTS has currently 9 stops in the city, as part of the first phase of the smart city project, which in the future will be expanded in the coming phases.

=== Metro ===
A light rail, Metrolite or Lite Metro (as referred in India), has been proposed by the Government of Chhattisgarh, which will start from Nava Raipur to Durg via Raipur and Bhilai.

=== Air ===
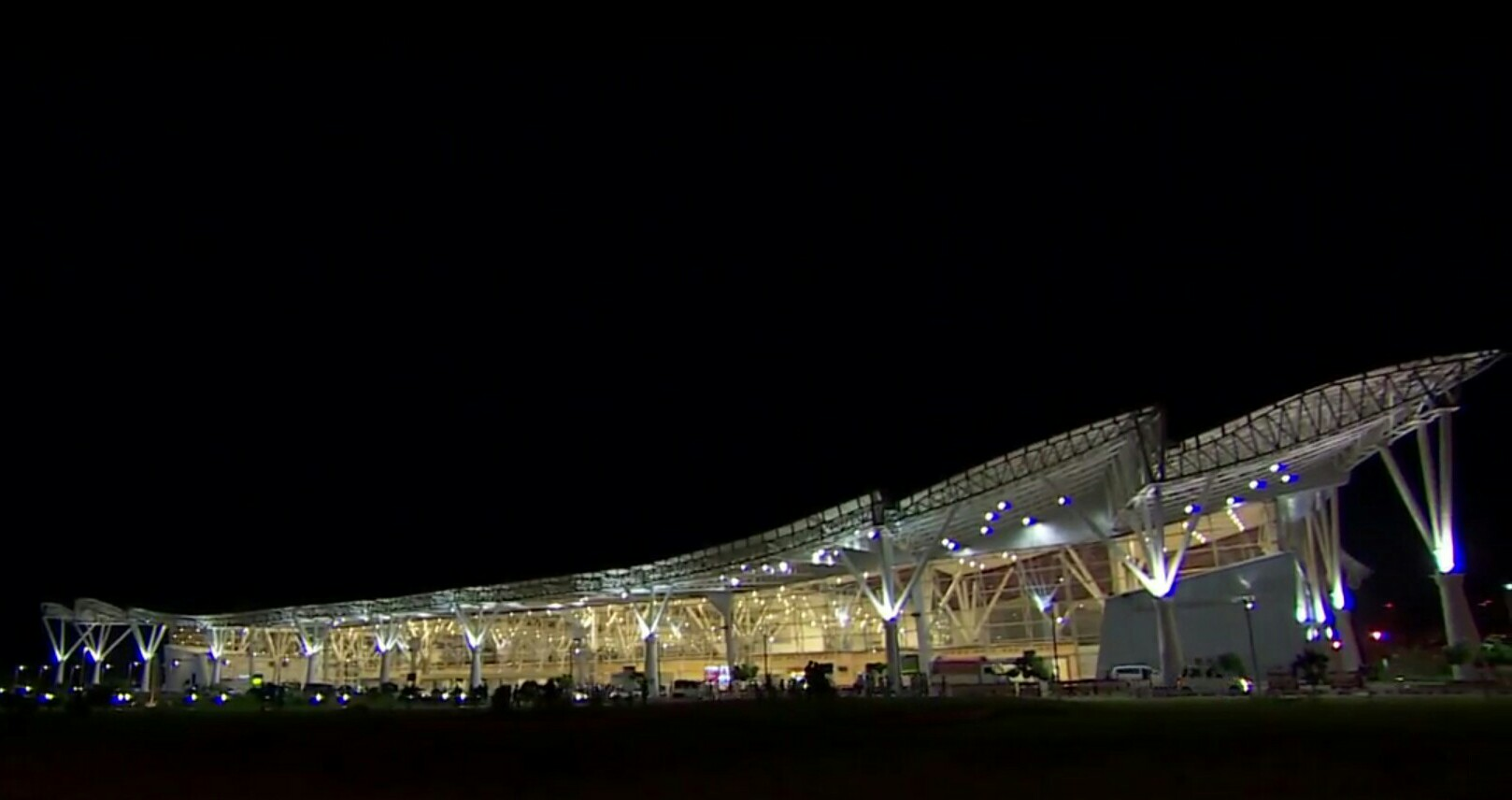
Swami Vivekananda Airport, Raipur

The nearest airport is Swami Vivekananda Airport, the only major airport of Chhattisgarh, lies within the city premises of the city, in its western outskirts, 10 km (6.2 mi) from the centre. The airport is well-connected, having daily direct flights to Mumbai, Delhi, Visakhapatnam, Kolkata, Bangalore, Pune, Chennai, Goa, Lucknow, Indore, Ahmedabad, Bhopal, Bhubaneswar, Nagpur, Hyderabad, Prayagraj, and Jagdalpur, operated by Alliance Air, IndiGo and Vistara airlines.

== Sports ==
Shaheed Veer Narayan Singh International Cricket Stadium is a recently constructed cricket stadium in the city. It was opened in 2008, and has a capacity to handle 65,000 spectators. It is the third largest cricket stadium in India and the fourth largest cricket stadium in the world by seating capacity.

The stadium was home ground for two matches for the Indian Premier League (IPL) team, Delhi Daredevils, during the 2013, 2015 and 2016 events.

The stadium hosted a half marathon, with the theme "Let Us Run" on 16 December 2012 to mark Vijay Diwas.

== Culture ==
Chhattisgarh is known for its rich cultural heritage, which includes folk music, dance, festivals, and traditional crafts.

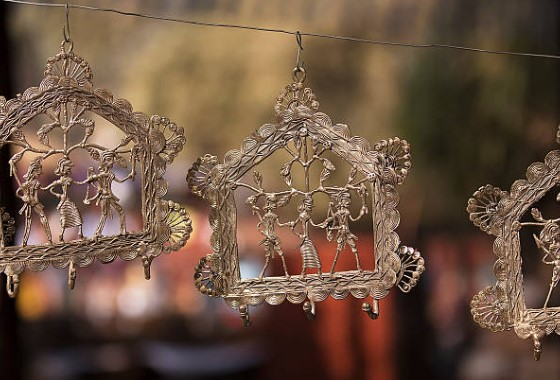
Chhatisgarh Culture

Folk music and dance: Chhattisgarh has many folk dances and music styles, including the famous Pandwani, a musical narration of the Mahabharata. Other dances include Raut Nacha, Panthi, Soowa, Paika, Chaitra Peram, Saila, Bagh, Osbara, and Disari.

Festivals: Chhattisgarh celebrates many festivals, including Chakradhar Samaroh, Sirpur Mahotsav, Rajim Kumbh, and Bastar Lokotsav.

Traditional crafts: Chhattisgarh has many traditional art and crafts.

Ornaments: Traditional ornaments include kardhan, phully, painjna, bidhu, tora, and maldar.

== See also ==
- Naya Raipur Development Authority
- Purkhouti Muktangan, Naya Raipur
- Atal Park
