= Raipur and Naya Raipur Bus Rapid Transit System =

Tatpar
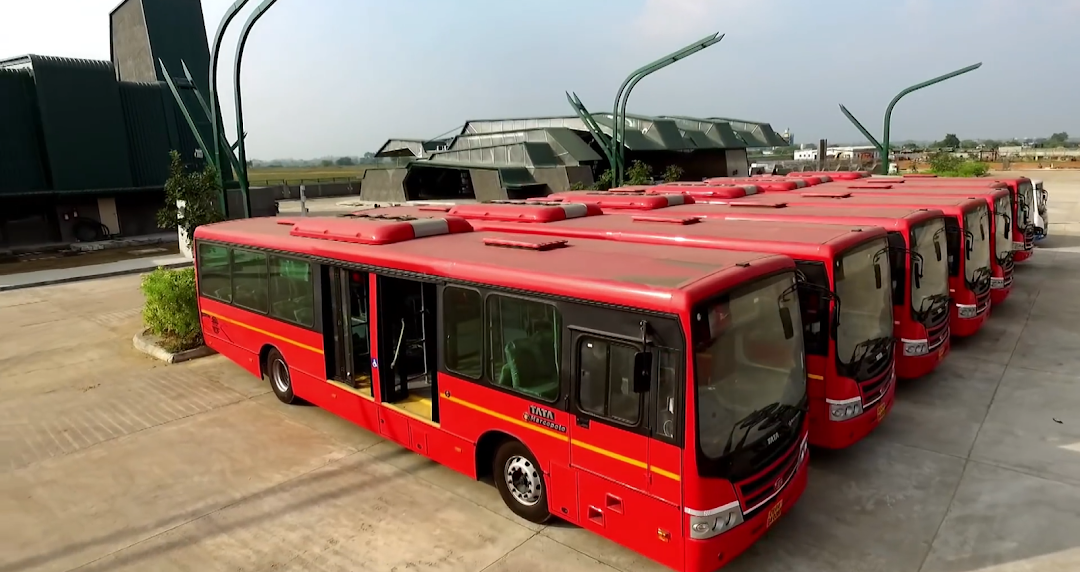

Overview
- Owner: Naya Raipur Mass Transport Ltd
- Locale: Raipur and Naya Raipur, Chhattisgarh, India
- Transit type: Bus rapid transit
- Number of lines: 3
- Number of stations: 9

Operation
- Began operation: 2 November 2016
- Operator: Naya Raipur Mass Transport Ltd (NRMTL)
- Number of vehicles: 30 diesel buses

Technical
- System length: 40 km

Raipur and Naya Raipur BRTS is a bus rapid transit in Raipur and Naya Raipur, Chhattisgarh India. It is operated by Naya Raipur Mass Transport Ltd (NRMTL). It was inaugurated by Prime Minister Narendra Modi on 2 November 2016.

== Routes ==
The bus route has nine stations and connects riders to Raipur Railway station. Its two routes cover 40 km total, and the buses are equipped with basic features like a tracking system and automatic doors. Route I carries passengers between the railway station and the capitol complex, and Route II takes riders between Naya and Raipur.

== See also ==
- List of bus rapid transit systems
