= Curitiba =

Capital city of Paraná, Brazil

- Municipality
- Município de Curitiba
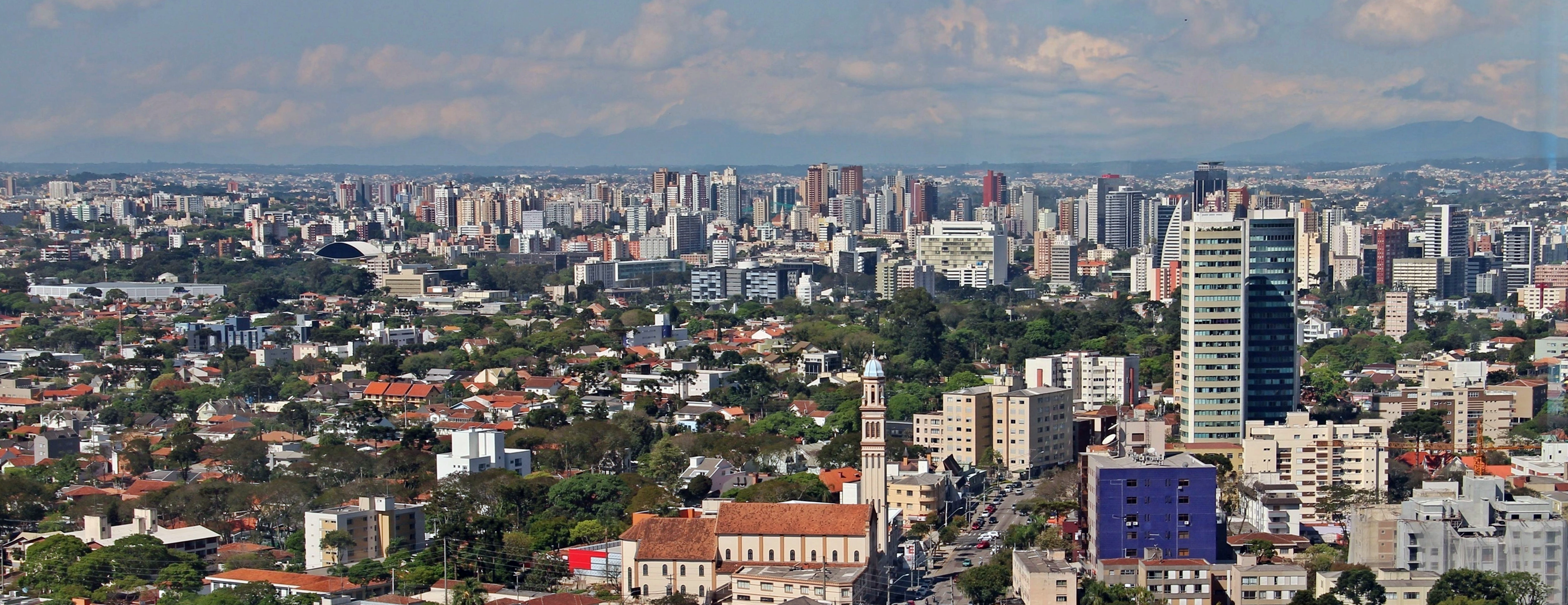
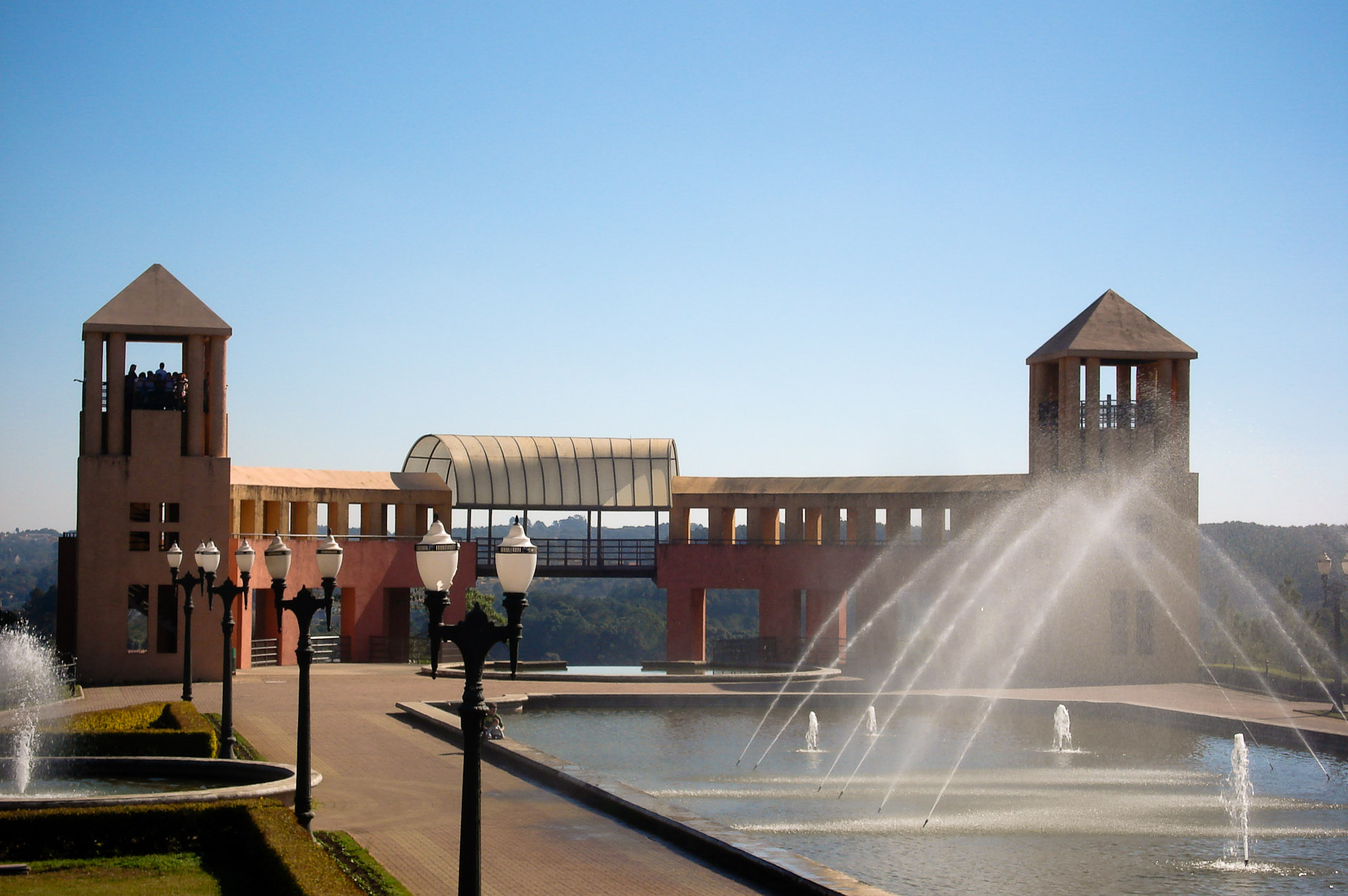
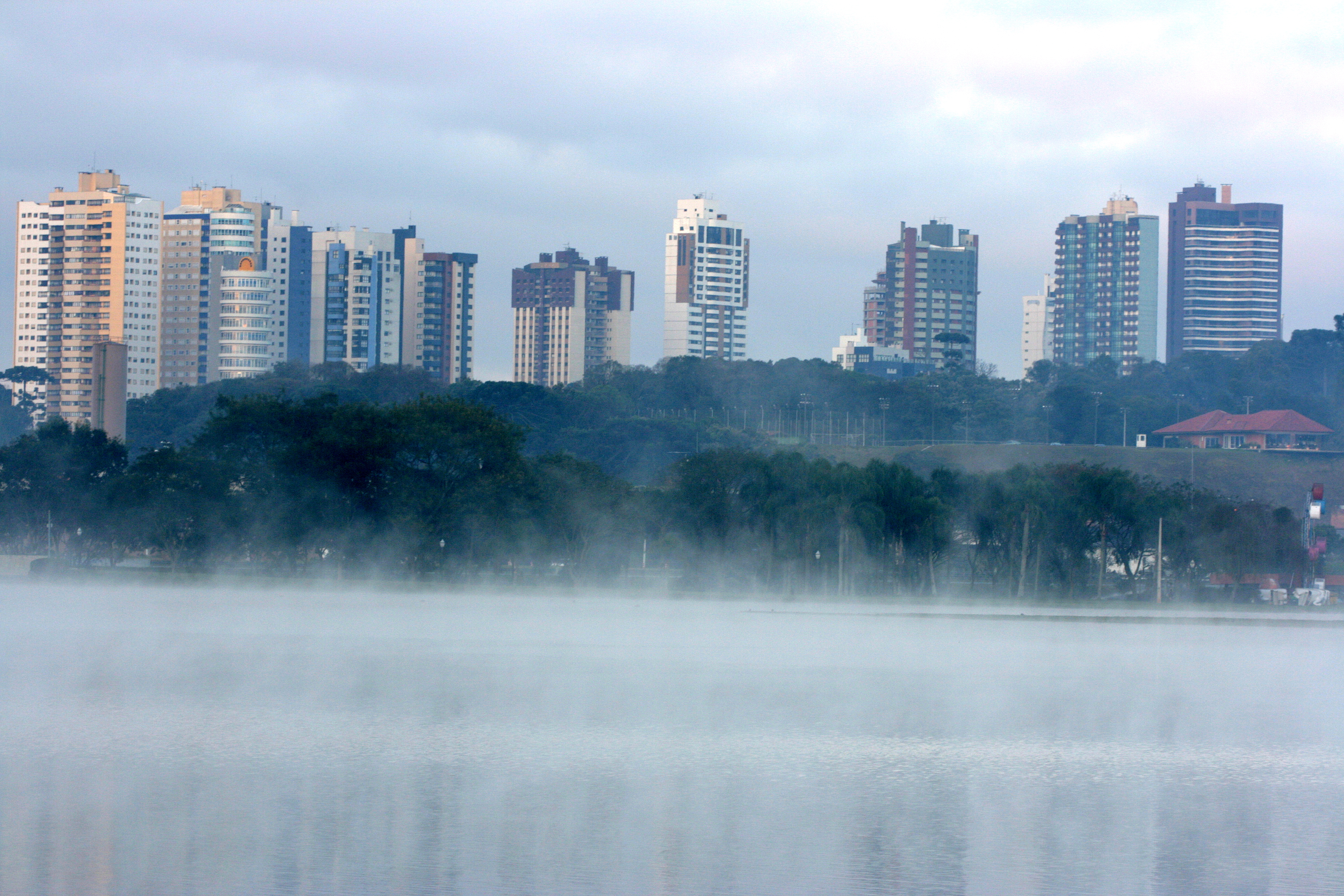
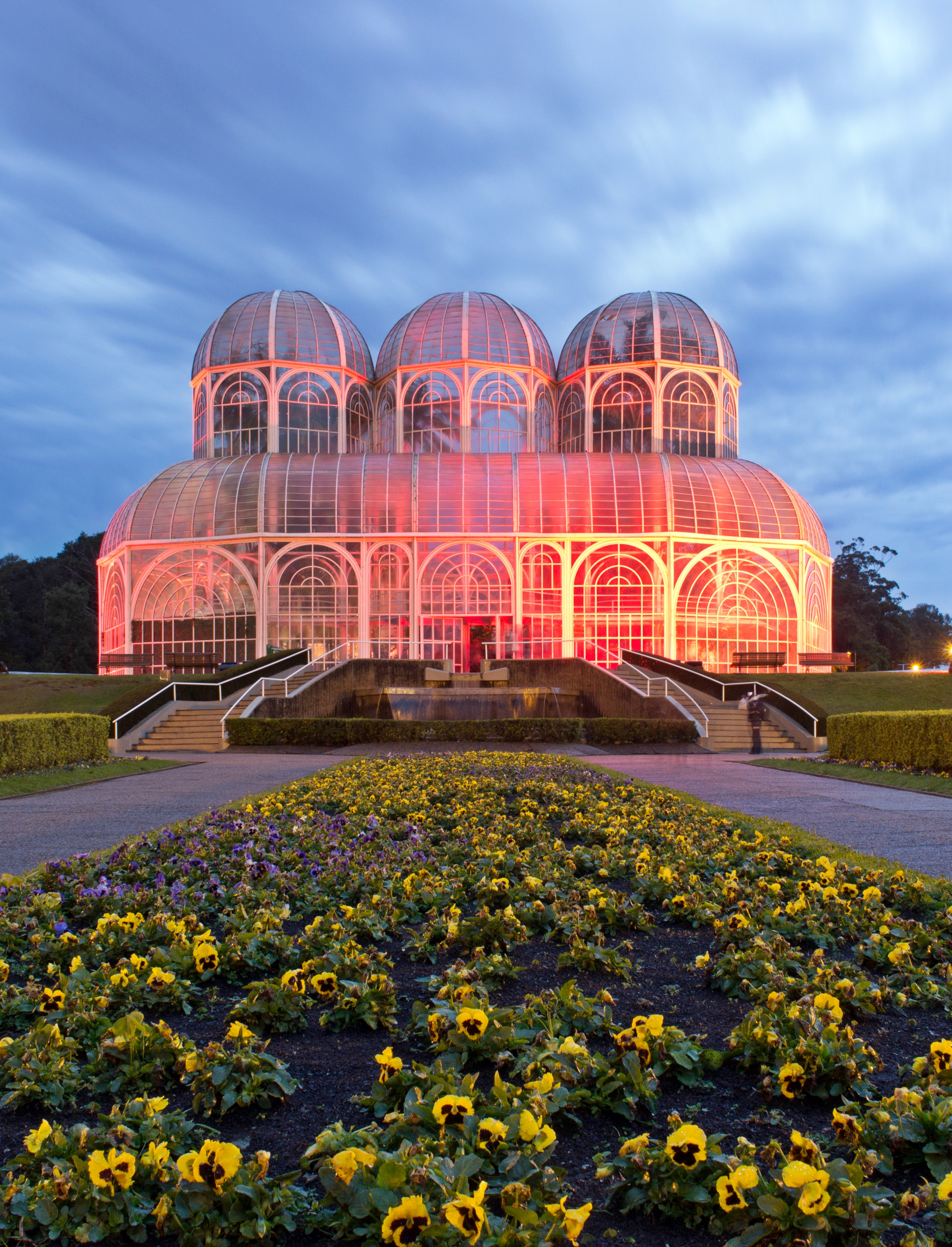
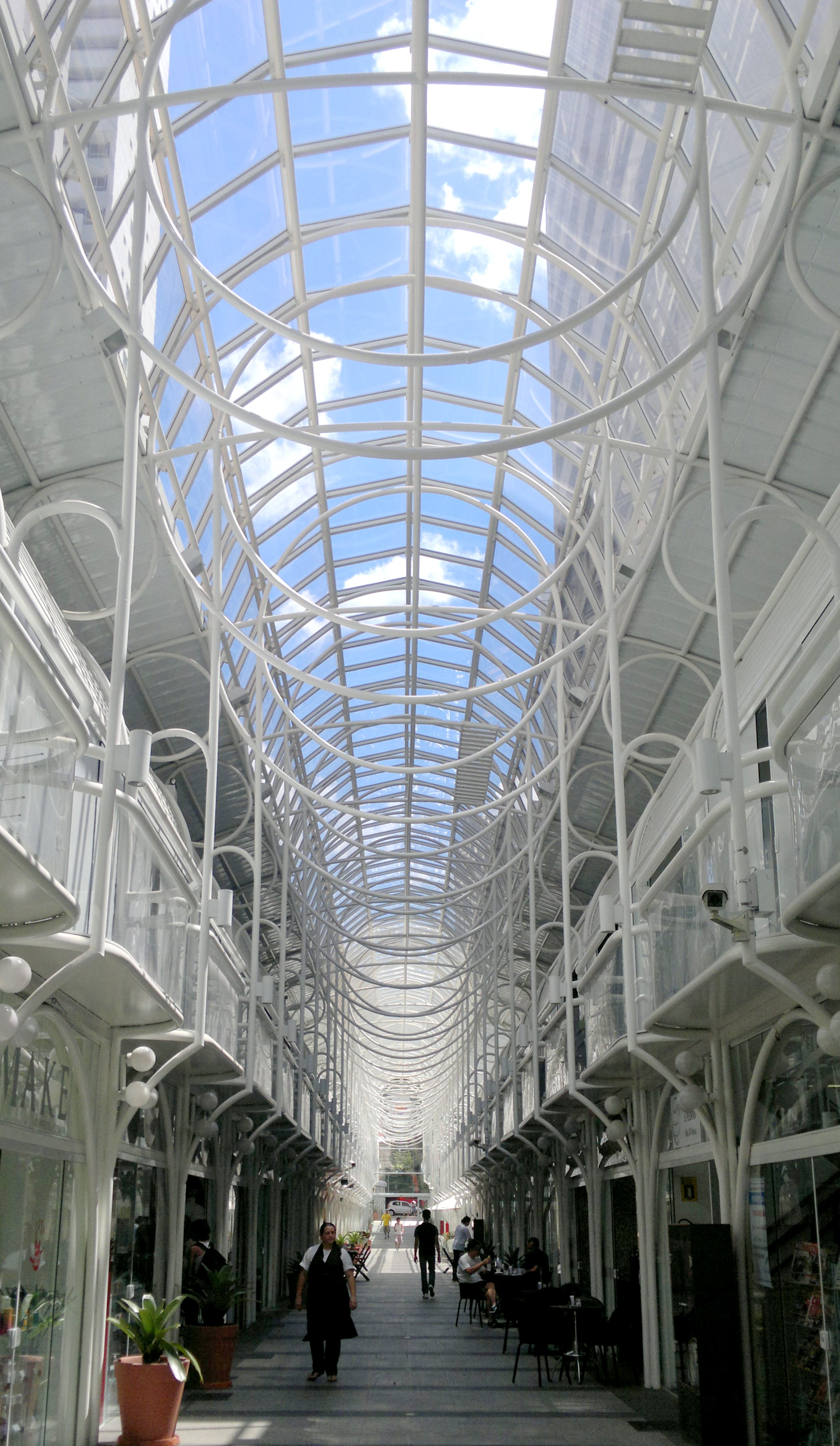
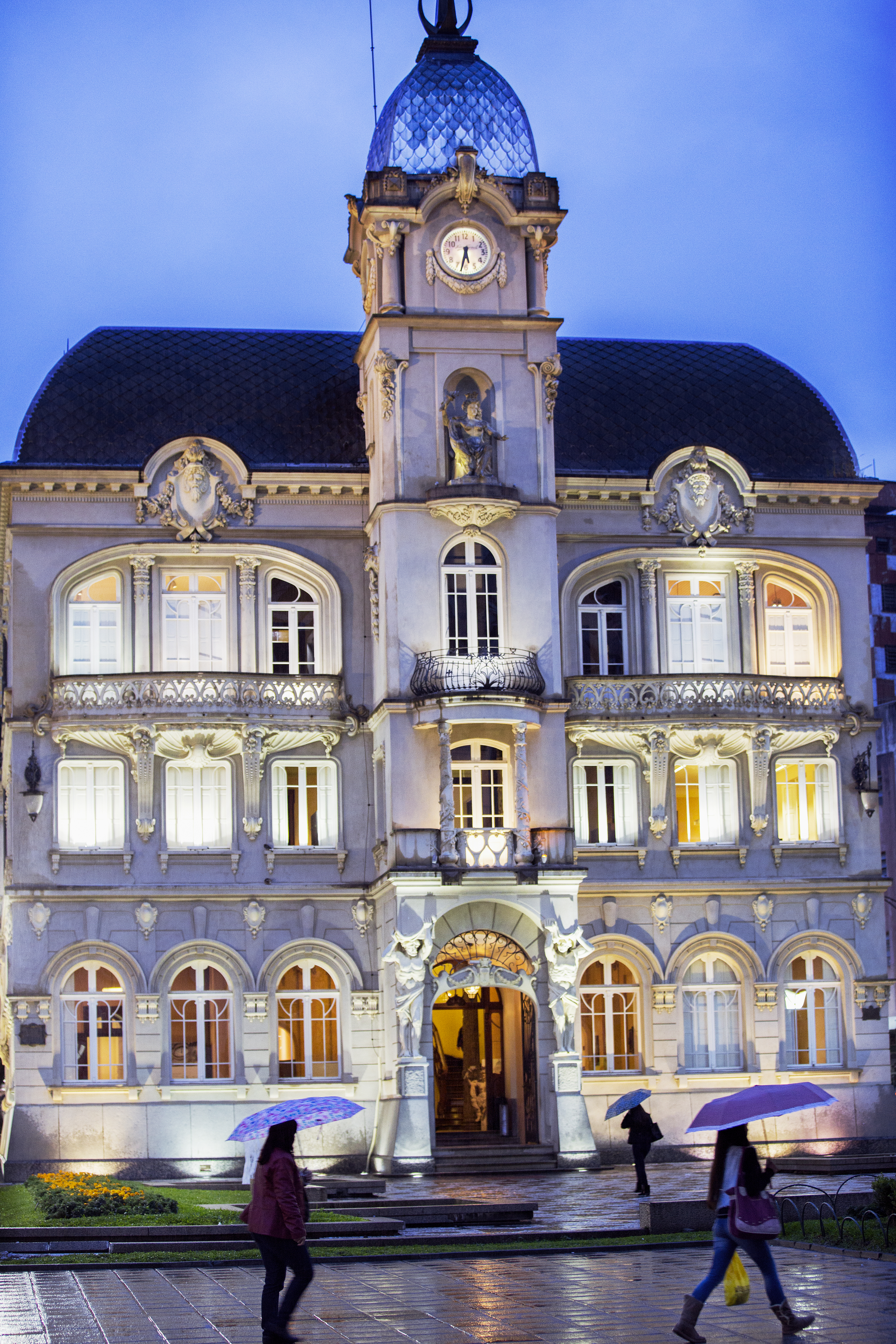
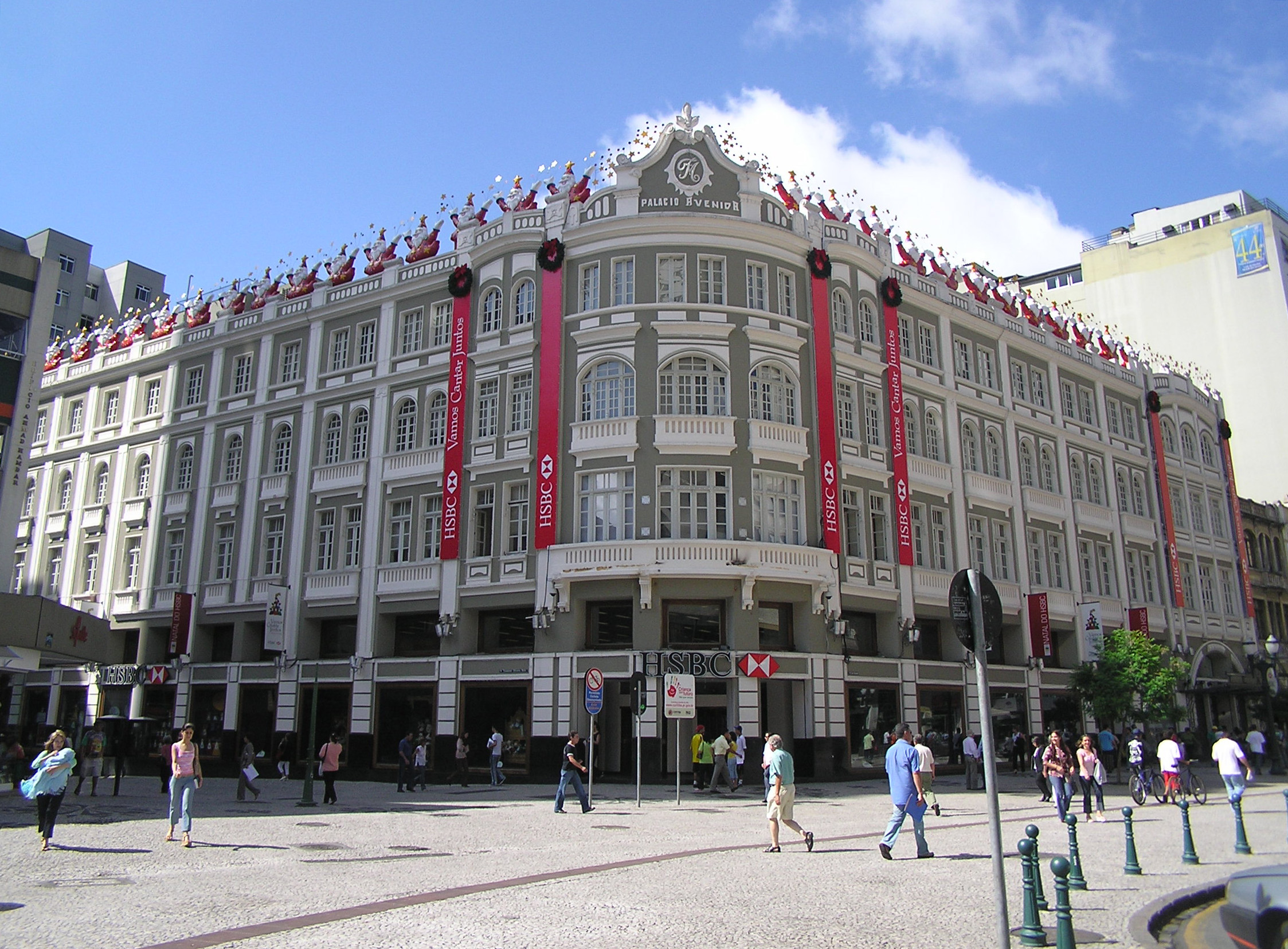
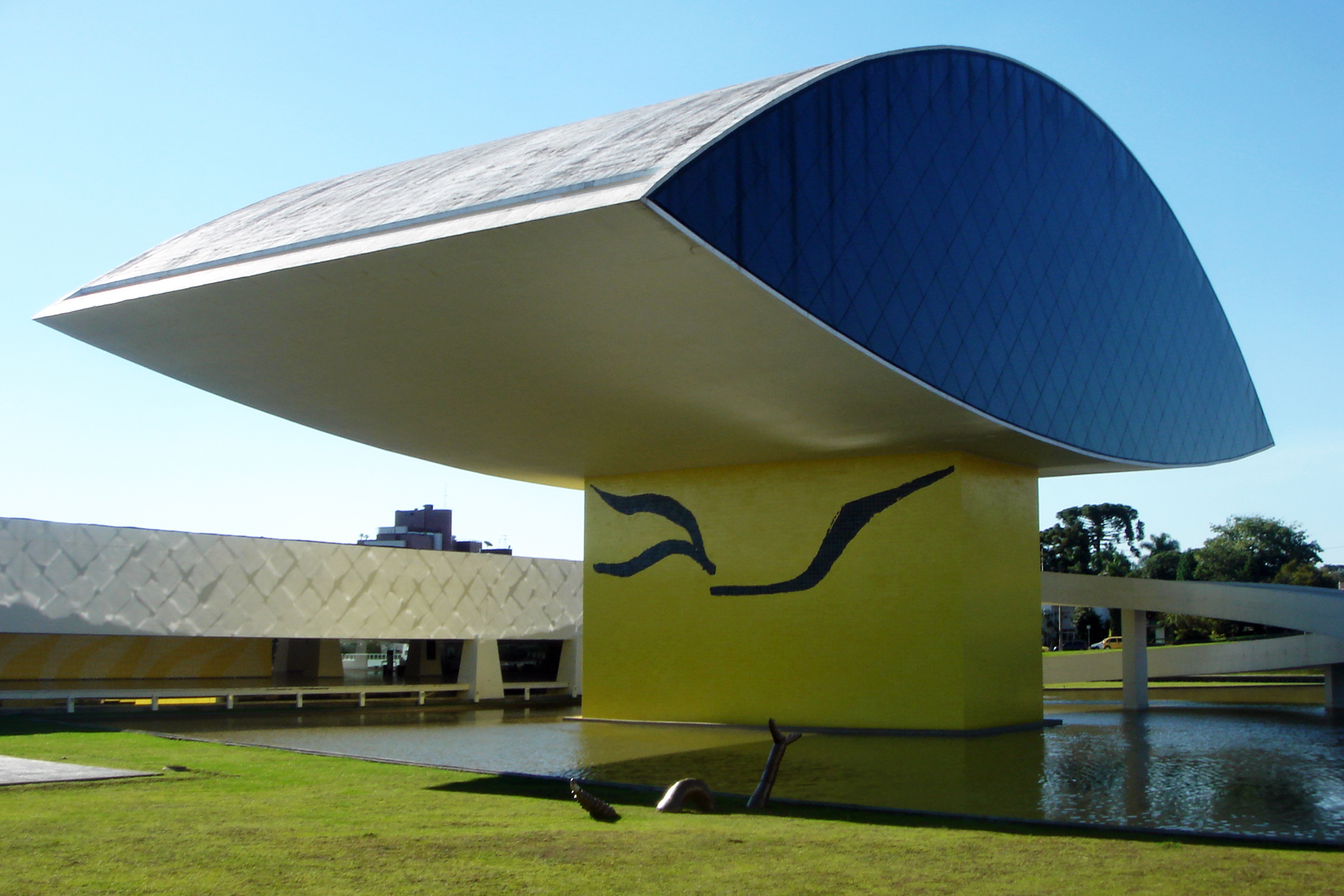
- View from Torre Panorâmica Tanguá Park Barigui Park Botanical Garden 24 Hour Street Paço da Liberdade Avenida Palace at 15 November Street Oscar Niemeyer Museum

- Flag Coat of arms
- Nicknames: Cidade Modelo ("Model City"); Capital Ecológica do Brasil ("Ecological Capital of Brazil"); Cidade Verde ("Green City"); Capital das Araucárias ("Capital of Araucarias"); A Cidade da Névoa Eterna ("The City of Eternal Fog")
- Motto: A Cidade da Gente ("Our City; The People's City")
- Interactive map of Curitiba
- Location within Brazil Location within Paraná Location within South America
- Coordinates: 25°25′47″S 49°16′16″W
- Country: Brazil
- Region: South
- State: Paraná
- Founded: 29 March 1693
- Incorporated: 1842

Government
  - Mayor: Eduardo Pimentel (PSD)

Area
  - Municipality: 430.9 km^{2} (166.4 sq mi)
  - Urban: 319.4 km^{2} (123.3 sq mi)
  - Metro: 15,416.9 km^{2} (5,952.5 sq mi)
- Elevation: 934.6 m (3,066 ft)

Population (2025)
  - Municipality: 1,830,795 (8th)
  - Density: 4,062/km^{2} (10,520/sq mi)
  - Metro: 3,559,366 (9th)
  - Metro density: 210.9/km^{2} (546/sq mi)
- Demonym(s): In Portuguese: curitibano (masculine), curitibana (feminine)

GDP (PPP, constant 2015 values)
  - Year: 2023
  - Total: $77.8 billion
- Time zone: UTC-3 (UTC-3)
- Postal code: 80000-000 to 82999-999
- Area code: +55 (41)
- HDI (2010): 0.823 – very high
- Major airport: Afonso Pena International Airport
- Website: curitiba.pr.gov.br (in Portuguese)

Curitiba (/ˌkʊərɪˈtʃiːbə/ KOOR-ih-CHEE-bə; Brazilian Portuguese: [kuɾiˈtʃibɐ]) is the capital and largest city in the state of Paraná in Southern Brazil. The city's population was 1,829,225 as of 2024, making it the eighth most populous city in Brazil and the largest in Brazil's South Region. The Curitiba metropolitan area comprises 29 municipalities with a total population of over 3,559,366, making it the ninth most populous metropolitan area in the country.

The city sits on a plateau at 932 m (3,058 ft) above sea level. It is located west of the seaport of Paranaguá and is served by the Afonso Pena International and Bacacheri airports. Curitiba is an important cultural, political, and economic center in Latin America and hosts the Federal University of Paraná, established in 1912.

In the 19th century, Curitiba's favorable location between cattle-breeding countryside and marketplaces led to a successful cattle trade and the city's first major expansion. Later, between 1850 and 1950, it grew due to logging and agricultural expansion in Paraná State (first Araucaria angustifolia logging, later mate and coffee cultivation and in the 1970s wheat, corn and soybean cultivation). In the 1850s, waves of European immigrants arrived in Curitiba, mainly Germans, Italians, Poles and Ukrainians, contributing to the city's economic and cultural development and richness in diversity. Nowadays, only small numbers of immigrants arrive, primarily from Middle Eastern and other South American countries.

Curitiba's biggest expansion occurred after the 1960s, with innovative urban planning that allowed the population to grow from some hundreds of thousands to more than a million people. Curitiba's economy is based on industry and services and is the seventh largest in Brazil. Economic growth occurred in parallel to a substantial inward flow of Brazilians from other parts of the country, as approximately half of the city's population was not born in Curitiba.

Curitiba is one of the 40 Brazilian cities with a very high Human Development Index (0.856) and in 2010 it was awarded the Global Sustainable City Award, given to cities and municipalities that excel in sustainable urban development. According to US magazine Reader's Digest, Curitiba is the best "Brazilian Big City" in which to live. Curitiba's crime rate is considered low by Brazilian standards and the city is considered one of the safest cities in Brazil for youth. The city is also regarded as the best in which to invest in Brazil. Curitiba was one of the host cities of the 1950 FIFA World Cup, and again for the 2014 FIFA World Cup. Curitiba’s unemployment rate was one of the lowest recorded in Brazil in 2025, at 4.3%, ranking third in terms of the economically active population, behind Palmas (TO) and Florianópolis (SC).

== Etymology ==
One theory is that the name Curitiba comes from the Tupi words kurí tyba 'many araucária seeds' due to the large number of Paraná pines pinecones in the region prior to its founding.

Another version, also using words from the Tupi language, is that it originates in the combination of kurit 'pine tree' and yba 'large amount'.

The Portuguese, who founded a settlement on the site in 1693, named it Vila da Nossa Senhora da Luz dos Pinhais, 'Town of Our Lady of the Light of the Pine Groves'.

The name was changed to Curitiba in 1721. Curitiba officially became a town in 1812, spelling its name Curityba.

An alternative spelling was Coritiba. This was used in press and state documents. A state decree in 1919 settled the dispute by adopting Curitiba.

== History ==
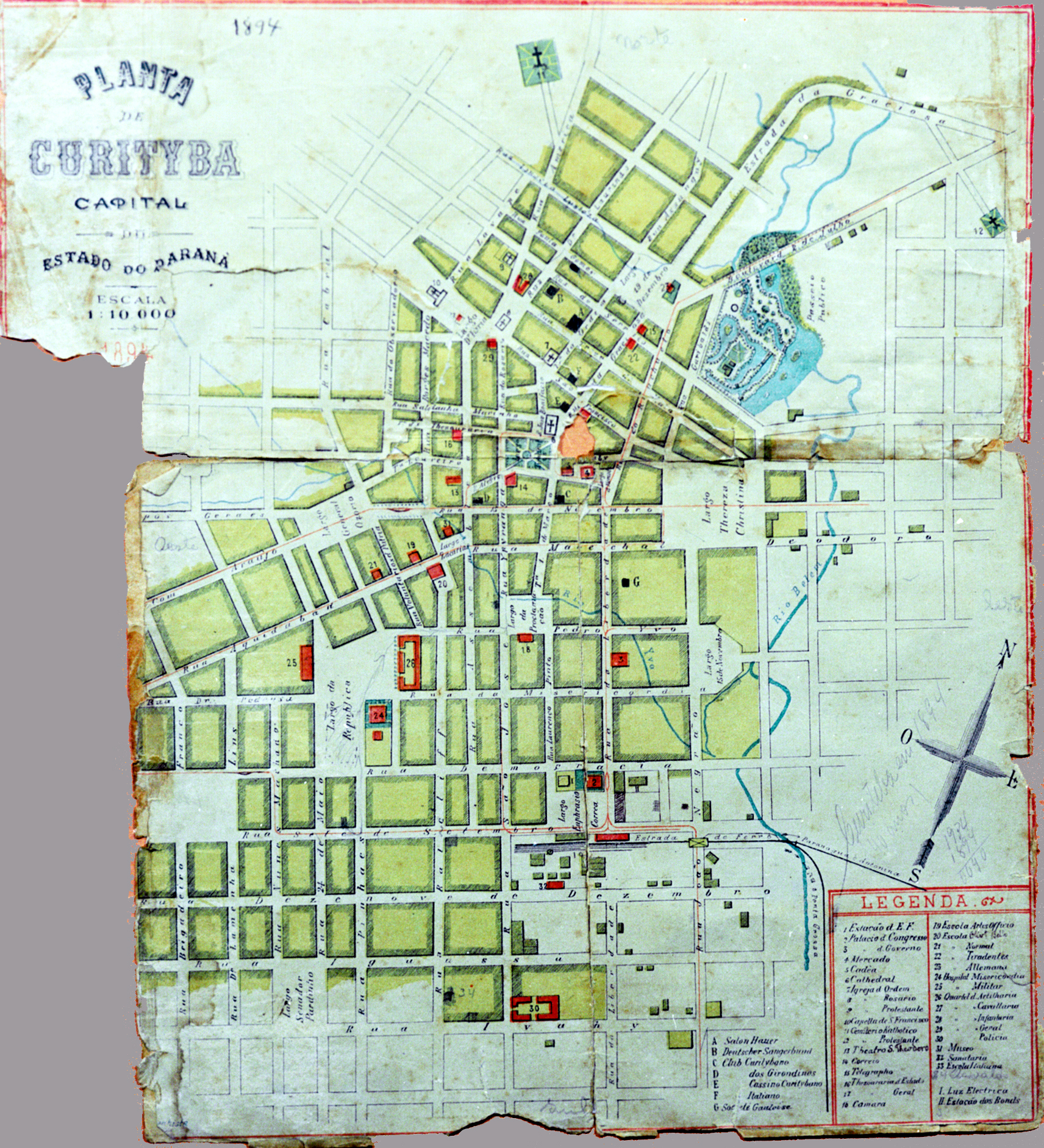
Curitiba in 1894 (Portuguese edition)

At the end of the 17th century, Curitiba's agriculture was only for subsistence and its main economic activities were mineral extraction. Waves of European immigrants arrived after 1850, mainly Poles, Italians, Germans (mostly Volga Germans from Russia) and Ukrainians.

Cattlemen drove their herds from Rio Grande do Sul to the state of São Paulo, turning Curitiba into an important intermediate trading post.

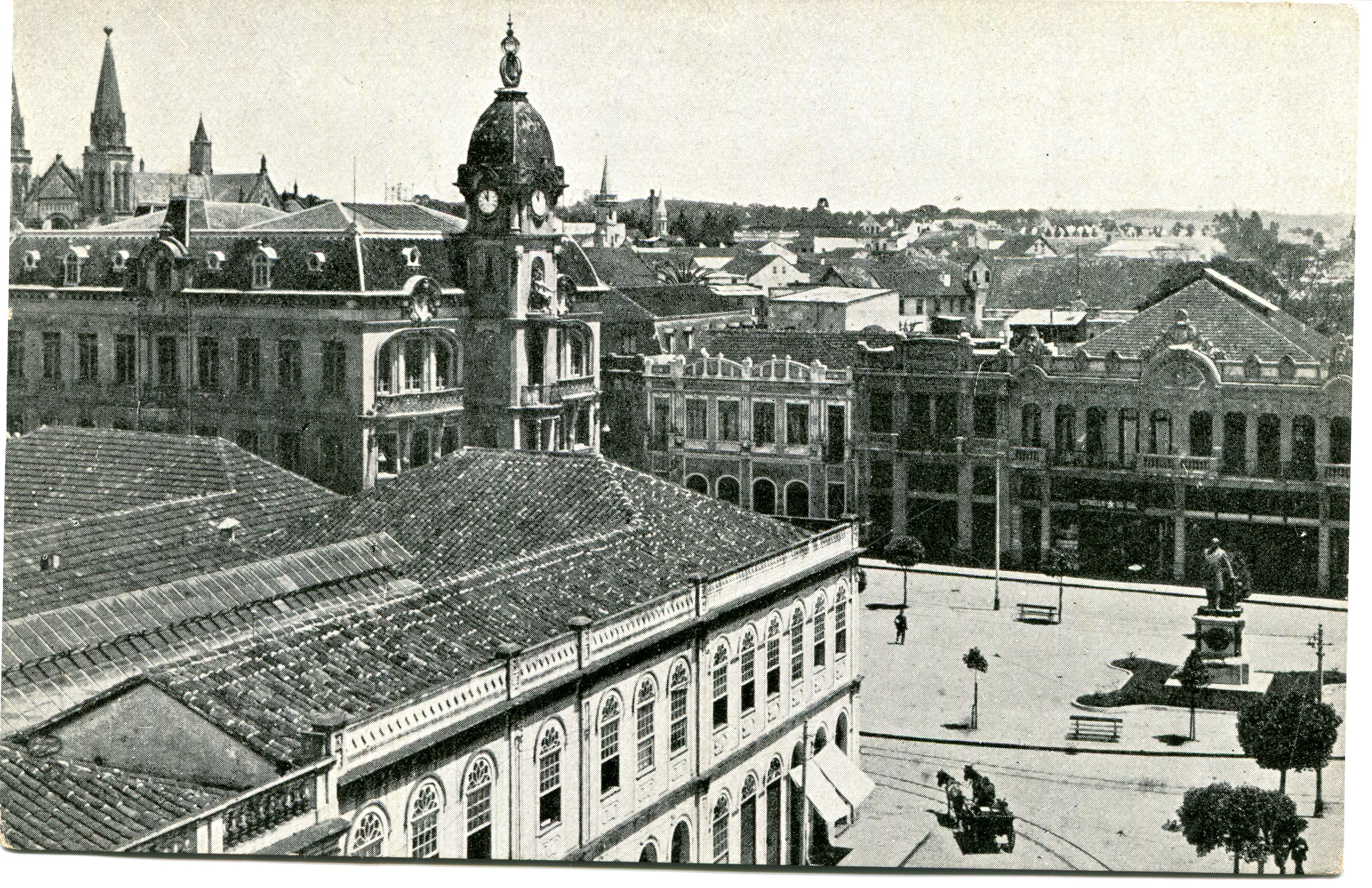
Curitiba in the 1920s

The Paranaguá–Curitiba railroad was opened in 1885.

Around the beginning of the 20th century, Curitiba benefited from the wealth of the yerba mate mills. The owners (known as "barões da erva-mate") built mansions in the capital. These have mostly been preserved in the districts of Batel and Alto da Glória.

In the 1940s and 1950s, Alfred Agache, co-founder of the French Society for Urban Studies, was hired to produce its first city plan. It emphasized a "star" of boulevards, with public amenities downtown, an industrial district and sanitation. It was followed in part, but the plan was too expensive to complete.

Curitiba has a long history of being intentional about city planning. The early leaders in Curitiba were the first people to establish building regulations. This included limiting the number of trees cut and requiring homes to have tile and not wood roofs. By 1960 Curitiba’s population had increased to 430,000 and Alfred Agache's plan for the city had not considered the future influx of immigrants. A group of young planners and architects led by Jaime Lerner from the Federal University of Paraná answered a proposal from Mayor Ivo Arzua centered around preparing Curitiba for new growth. They improved Agache’s plan by proposing adding major linear transit pathways to Curitiba to provide straightforward high-speed routes throughout the city. They also included plans for reducing downtown traffic, minimizing urban sprawl, providing easily accessible and inexpensive public transit, and preserving Curitiba’s historic district. This intelligent and well-thought-out proposal was adopted and became the Curitiba Master Plan. Jaime Lerner went on to create the city's first urban planning department in order to facilitate further redevelopment efforts.

== Geography ==
Location on a map of municipalities of Paraná

Curitiba, the capital of the Paraná state of southern Brazil, is located near the Atlantic margin of the Brazilian Highlands and the headwaters of the Iguaçu River. It is around 3,050 feet (930 meters) above sea level.

The most important rivers that form six hydrographic basins within the municipal territory are, in addition to the Iguaçu River, the Atuba, Belém, Barigui, Passaúna, and the Padilhas stream, all with similar drainage characteristics.

The most extensive hydrographic basin in Curitiba is that of the Barigui River, which crosses the municipality from north to south and covers 139.9 km² of the municipality's area. To the south, there is the least extensive hydrographic basin in Curitiba, that of the Padilhas stream, with 33.6 km². As the relief of Curitiba is predominantly higher in the north of the municipality, six hydrographic basins, in their entirety, descend towards the south of the municipality, flowing into the Iguaçu River, the most important river in Curitiba, which, in turn, flows into the Paraná River, in the far west of the state.

Due to certain peculiarities, rainfall habitually causes significant flooding in the rivers of Curitiba, resulting in regular floods, which constantly worries the population and the public administration. Nowadays, after many studies regarding local waterways, almost all of the rivers are being channeled.

=== Climate ===
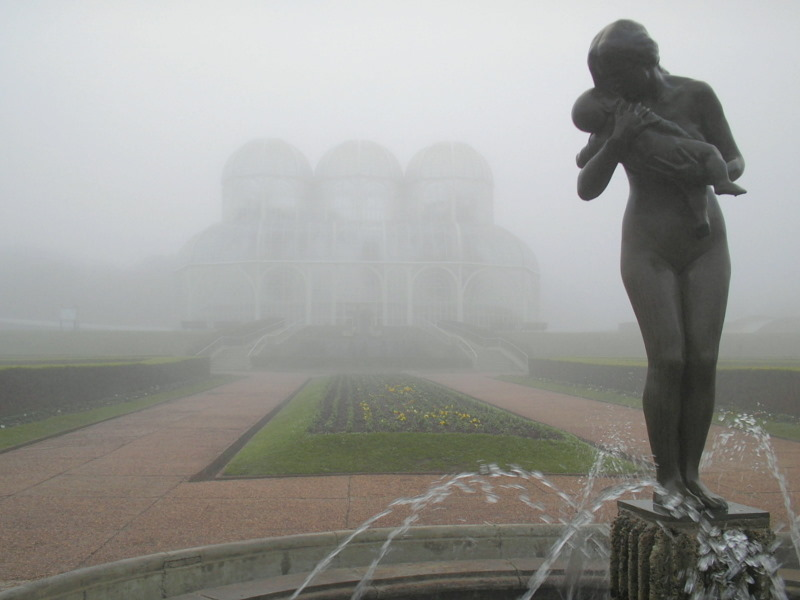
Fog in the Botanical Garden

Curitiba features a temperate oceanic climate (Köppen: Cfb, Trewartha: Cfbl). Its location on a plateau and the flat terrain with flooded areas contributes to its somewhat mild and damp winters, with an average minimum temperature of 9 °C (48 °F) in July. Nighttime temperatures can drop below 0 °C (32 °F) on the coldest days. Daytime temperatures in winter are usually pleasant, around 19 °C (66 °F). However, during cold snaps, daytime temperatures might not rise above 10 °C (50 °F), and on rare occasions, above 5 °C (41 °F).

Because it is located in a temperate zone, temperatures in Curitiba show marked seasonal variation, resulting in highly variable weather conditions in the city, especially during autumn and winter. Temperature variations over the course of a single day can also be significant, particularly in autumn and winter. The passage of frontal systems and air masses with different characteristics can cause rapid changes in atmospheric conditions. After the passage of a cold front, for example, temperatures may drop significantly; in other situations, the influence of dry air masses favors a large temperature range between the early morning hours and the afternoon.

During winter, cold days are common due to the passage of polar air masses, alternating with days of large temperature ranges or even warm days, caused by the advance of the dry air mass that settles over the interior of Brazil at this time of year. During summer, the significant altitude, combined with the rainfall typical of the season, helps prevent temperatures—both minimum and maximum—from rising excessively. Autumn and spring are transitional seasons.

Snowfall was experienced in 1889, 1892, 1912, 1928 (snowstorm, two days), 1942, 1955, 1957, 1962, 1975, 1988, 2013 and 2020. Huge accumulation, however, is rarer.

During summertime, the average temperature is around 25 °C (77 °F) at daytime, but it can get above 30 °C (86 °F) on the hottest days. However, temperatures above 21 °C (70 °F) at night are rare.

The terrain's flatness hinders water drainage after rain, therefore providing water vapor for the atmosphere. Cold fronts come year round, often from Antarctica and Argentina, bringing extratropical cyclones, and cold winds and frost in the winter. They can move very quickly, with no more than one day between the start of the southern winds and the start of rain. Curitiba's weather is also influenced by the dry air masses that dominate Brazil's midwest most of the year, bringing hot and dry weather, sometimes even in winter.

Climate data for Curitiba (1991–2020 normals, extremes 1885–present)
Month	Jan	Feb	Mar	Apr	May	Jun	Jul	Aug	Sep	Oct	Nov	Dec	Year
Record high °C (°F)	35.4 (95.7)	34.8 (94.6)	33.9 (93.0)	32.6 (90.7)	30.5 (86.9)	28.2 (82.8)	28.6 (83.5)	31.6 (88.9)	34.2 (93.6)	35.5 (95.9)	35.2 (95.4)	35.0 (95.0)	35.5 (95.9)
Mean daily maximum °C (°F)	26.3 (79.3)	26.6 (79.9)	26.1 (79.0)	24.4 (75.9)	21.1 (70.0)	20.3 (68.5)	20.1 (68.2)	21.9 (71.4)	22.3 (72.1)	23.7 (74.7)	25.0 (77.0)	25.7 (78.3)	22.8 (73.0)
Daily mean °C (°F)	21.3 (70.3)	21.4 (70.5)	20.8 (69.4)	18.5 (65.3)	15.5 (59.9)	14.3 (57.7)	13.8 (56.8)	14.9 (58.8)	16.0 (60.8)	17.7 (63.9)	18.9 (66.0)	20.7 (69.3)	17.8 (64.0)
Mean daily minimum °C (°F)	16.5 (61.7)	17.0 (62.6)	15.8 (60.4)	14.8 (58.6)	11.8 (53.2)	10.3 (50.5)	9.3 (48.7)	10.1 (50.2)	11.9 (53.4)	13.9 (57.0)	15.0 (59.0)	16.1 (61.0)	12.8 (55.0)
Record low °C (°F)	8.2 (46.8)	6.8 (44.2)	3.9 (39.0)	−4.0 (24.8)	−2.3 (27.9)	−4.4 (24.1)	−5.2 (22.6)	−5.2 (22.6)	−5.4 (22.3)	−1.5 (29.3)	−0.9 (30.4)	3.6 (38.5)	−5.4 (22.3)
Average precipitation mm (inches)	226.3 (8.91)	188.7 (7.43)	151.3 (5.96)	87.9 (3.46)	95.6 (3.76)	111.6 (4.39)	105.8 (4.17)	81.5 (3.21)	143.3 (5.64)	160.7 (6.33)	125.6 (4.94)	152.4 (6.00)	1,630.7 (64.2)
Average precipitation days (≥ 1 mm)	15.4	13.2	11.7	7.1	7.7	6.8	6.8	5.7	8.8	11.3	10.3	12.3	117.1
Average snowy days (≥ 1.0 cm)	0.0	0.0	0.0	0.0	0.0	0.0	0.1	0.0	0.0	0.0	0.0	0.0	0.1
Average relative humidity (%)	80.6	80.6	81.8	81.3	83.2	82.2	80.2	77.1	79.8	81.4	79.1	78.6	80.5
Average dew point °C (°F)	18.2 (64.8)	18.3 (64.9)	17.5 (63.5)	15.7 (60.3)	13.1 (55.6)	11.9 (53.4)	10.9 (51.6)	11.5 (52.7)	12.9 (55.2)	14.8 (58.6)	15.6 (60.1)	17.2 (63.0)	14.8 (58.6)
Mean monthly sunshine hours	161.9	150.1	159	161.2	147.1	141.2	165.5	180.4	136.2	135.5	158.9	165.1	1,862.1
Average ultraviolet index	12	12	12	9	6	5	5	7	9	11	12	12	9
Source 1: Instituto Nacional de Meteorologia
Source 2: Meteo Climat (record highs and lows) and Weather Atlas (UV index)

Climate data for Curitiba (Civic Center), elevation: 924 m, 1961–1990 normals
Month	Jan	Feb	Mar	Apr	May	Jun	Jul	Aug	Sep	Oct	Nov	Dec	Year
Mean daily maximum °C (°F)	25.6 (78.1)	25.8 (78.4)	24.9 (76.8)	22.3 (72.1)	21.1 (70.0)	18.3 (64.9)	19.4 (66.9)	20.9 (69.6)	21.3 (70.3)	22.6 (72.7)	24.5 (76.1)	25.4 (77.7)	22.7 (72.8)
Daily mean °C (°F)	19.6 (67.3)	19.9 (67.8)	19.0 (66.2)	16.7 (62.1)	14.6 (58.3)	12.2 (54.0)	12.8 (55.0)	14.0 (57.2)	15.0 (59.0)	16.5 (61.7)	18.2 (64.8)	19.3 (66.7)	16.5 (61.7)
Mean daily minimum °C (°F)	15.8 (60.4)	16.3 (61.3)	15.4 (59.7)	12.8 (55.0)	10.2 (50.4)	7.8 (46.0)	8.1 (46.6)	9.2 (48.6)	10.8 (51.4)	12.5 (54.5)	14.0 (57.2)	15.4 (59.7)	12.4 (54.2)
Average precipitation mm (inches)	165.0 (6.50)	142.1 (5.59)	126.6 (4.98)	90.0 (3.54)	99.2 (3.91)	98.1 (3.86)	89.0 (3.50)	74.5 (2.93)	115.4 (4.54)	134.2 (5.28)	123.8 (4.87)	150.1 (5.91)	1,408 (55.41)
Average relative humidity (%)	79.0	80.0	80.0	79.0	82.0	76.0	81.0	79.0	82.0	82.0	80.0	82.0	80.2
Mean monthly sunshine hours	159.8	135.0	142.0	137.2	152.2	129.7	147.6	148.3	122.1	137.2	152.2	150.9	1,714.2
Source: NOAA

=== Vegetation ===
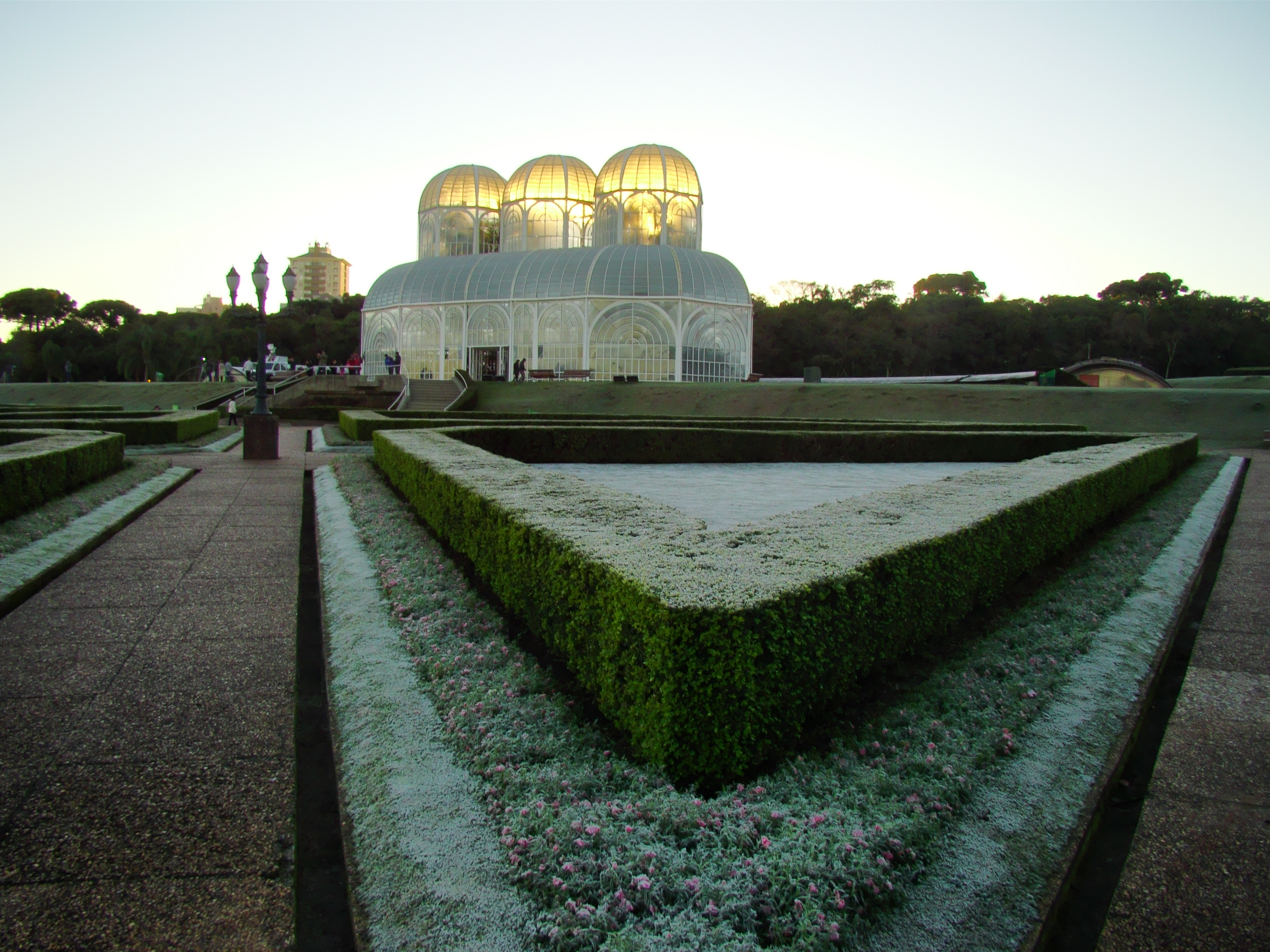
Frost in Curitiba

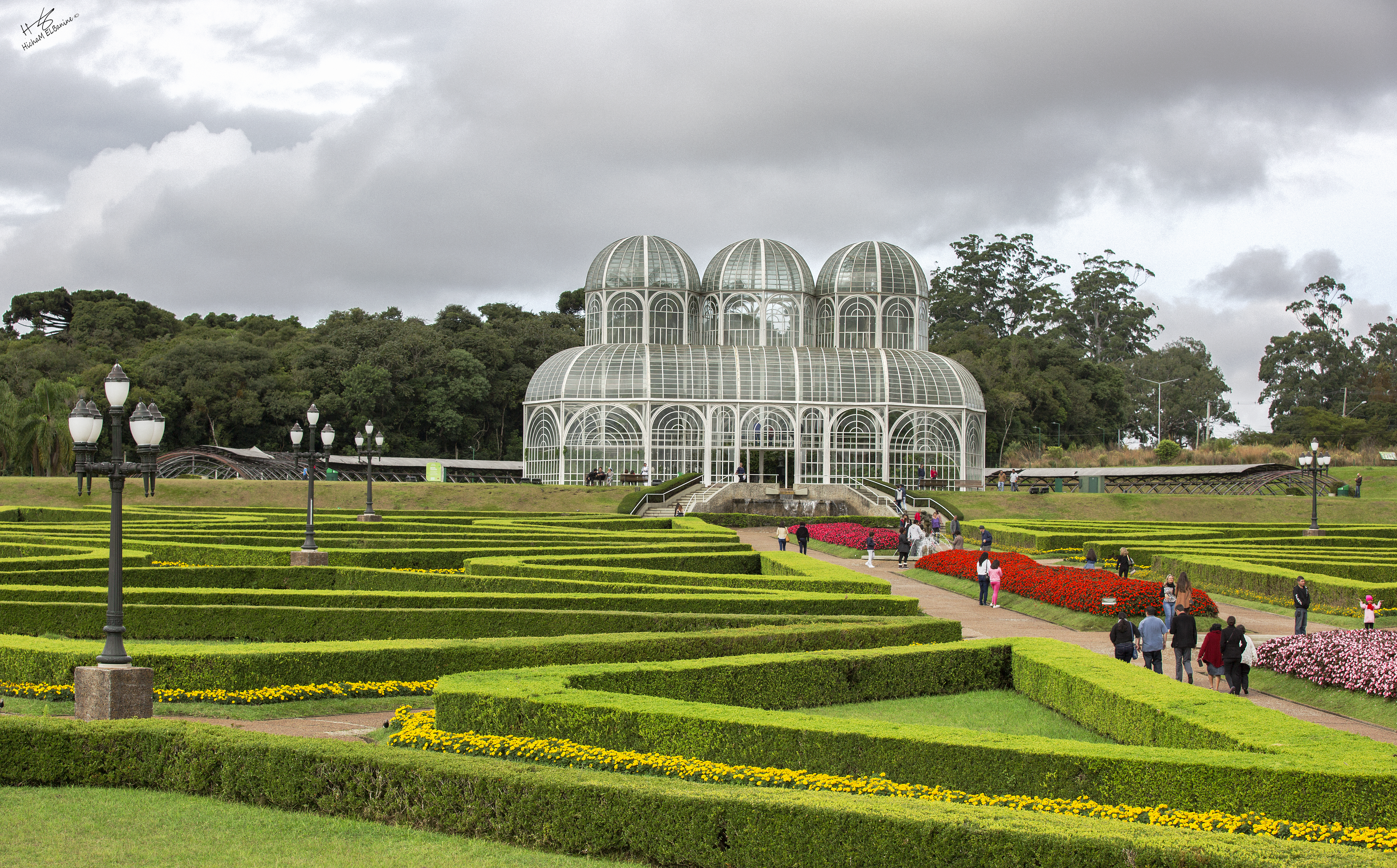
Botanical gardens greenhouse in Curitiba

Curitiba is located in the area of the Ombrophilous Mixed Forest (also known as Araucaria moist forests), a sub-type of the Atlantic Forest. In Curitiba it is possible to find steppes, forests and other formations. The local vegetation consists of remnants of the Paraná (or Brazilian) pine (Araucaria angustifolia), which resisted the efforts of settlers. The Paraná pines are in private and public areas and are protected from logging. The Municipal Secretariat of the Environment maintains a botanical garden and three greenhouses that produce 150,000 native and exotic seedlings: 16,000 fruit trees, 260,000 flowers, foliage and underbrush specimens and the maintenance of another 350,000 seedlings.

Curitiba's green area itself matches the size of other large Brazilian cities. The vegetation of Curitiba encompasses a large population of purple and yellow ipês (tabebuias), who flower at the end of winter. The yellow ipê is one of the city's most common tree.

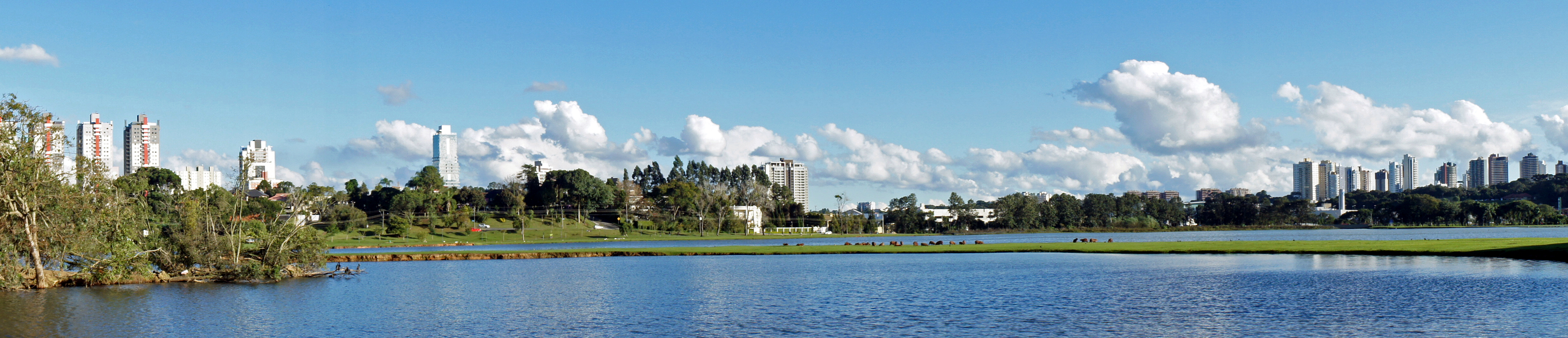
Panoramic view of Barigui Park.

=== Hydrography ===
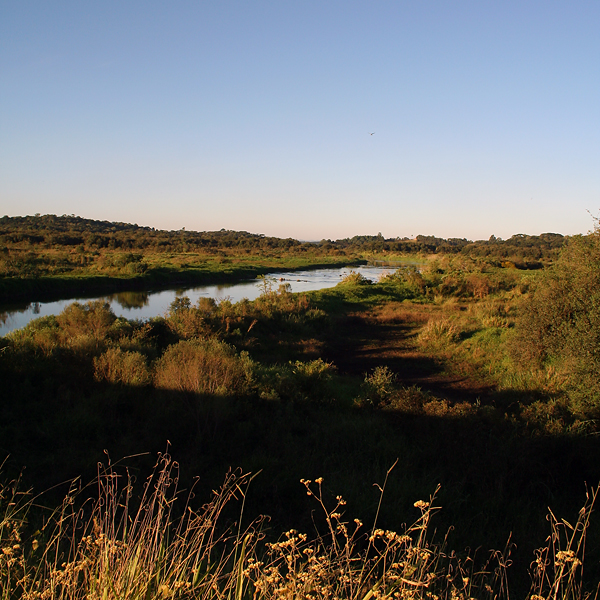
Iguaçu River, running by the south region of the city

The catchment area of Curitiba consists of rivers and streams that cross the city in different directions, grouped in six river basins. The main rivers that form the city's watershed are: Atuba River, Belém River, Barigüi River, Passaúna River, Ribeirão dos Padilhas and the Iguaçu River, all with characteristics of dendritic drainage. Curitiba has been working since the 1970s on alternatives to minimize the negative impacts of urbanization on rivers. An example is the construction of parks along the rivers with artificial lakes, which absorb and retain water for longer periods of time, minimizing floods. After many studies of local water flows, most rivers were found to be subject to a canalization process. Other alternatives developed to minimize the negative effects of urbanization are the implementation of programs for environmental education, inspection and monitoring, elaboration and application of legislation and infrastructure works.

=== Topography ===
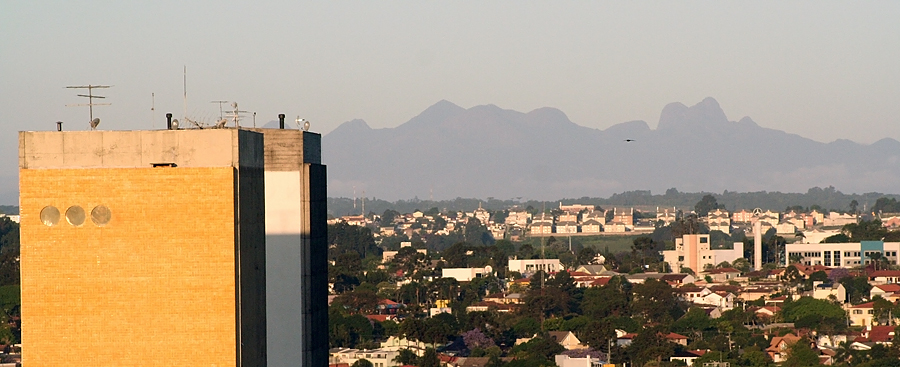
The Mountain Range of the Sea, "Serra do Mar"

The city covers 432.17 km^{2} (166.86 sq mi) on the First Plateau of Paraná. Curitiba has a topography of smooth, rounded hills, giving it a relatively regular shape. The city has an average altitude of 934.6 m (3,066 ft) above sea level. The highest point is to the north at 1,021 m (3,350 ft), and with lower altitudes at 864 m (2,835 ft) to the south.

Mountain ranges and sets of rocky hills surround parts of the city, including the Serra do Mar, a hill range between the shore of the Atlantic Ocean and the First Plateau in Paraná.

== Government ==
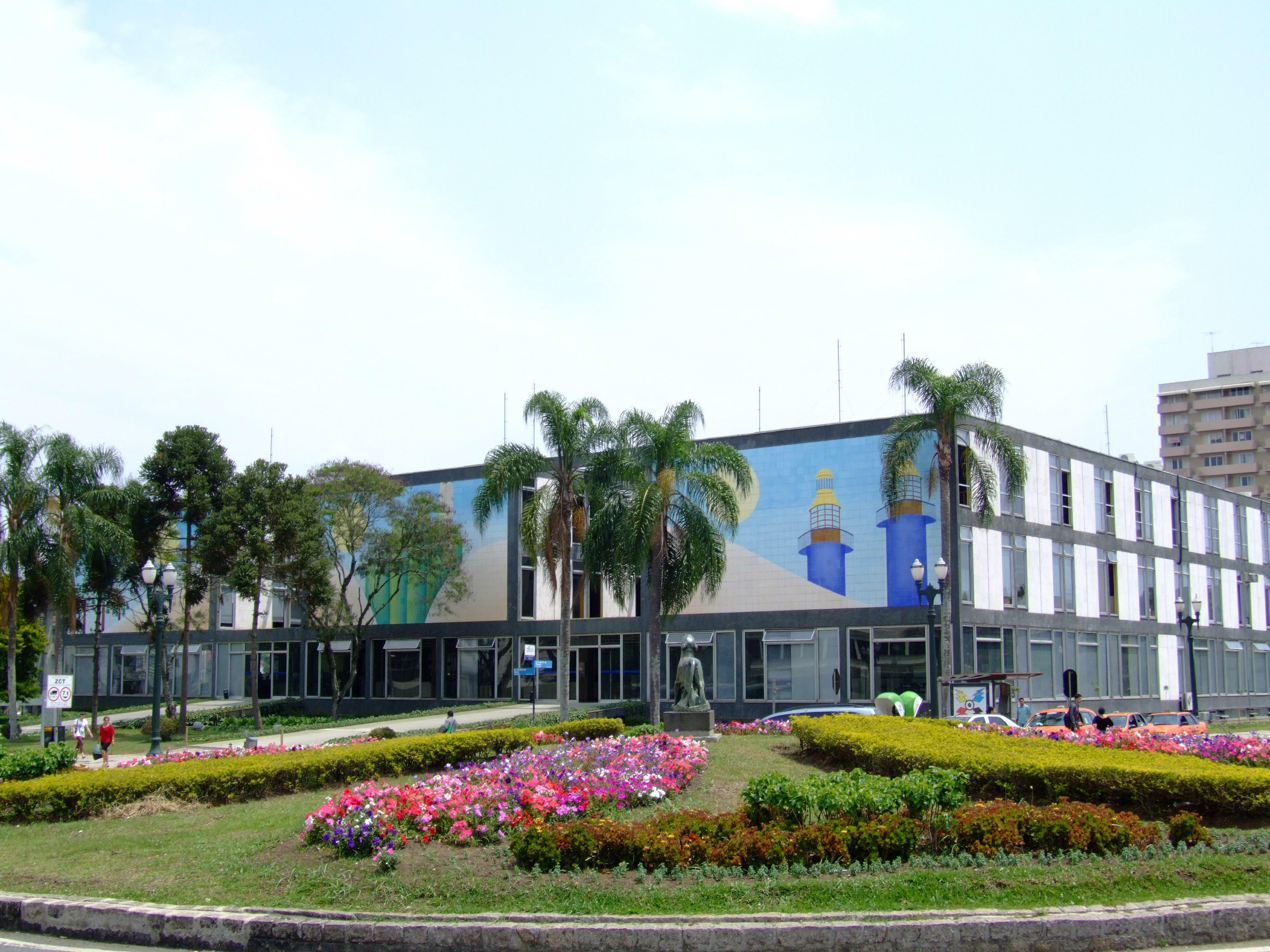
The Curitiba City Hall

As of 2017, the mayor is Rafael Greca, who replaced Gustavo Fruet. The City Council of Curitiba has 38 councillors elected since 2004. Curitiba is divided into nine regional governments (equivalent to subprefecture), who manage the municipality's 75 districts. The Rua da Cidadania ("Street of Citizenship") is the symbol of administrative decentralization; it is a reference point and a meeting place. Several units are annexed to public transport terminals. Their nuclei offer services in the local, state and federal areas.

Jaime Lerner is perhaps Curitiba's best-known mayor. He was the mayor three times, the first time in the early 1970s. His leadership was crucial to some major changes in the city. Curitiba has built parks instead of canals to reduce flooding; used parks to make the city more liveable; pedestrianised the downtown area; built a Bus Rapid Transit (BRT), a bus system that works similarly to a light rail system; and started a massive recycling scheme that included giving people bus tokens in return for waste.

== Demographics ==
=== Ethnic groups ===
Race and ethnicity in Curitiba
Ethnicity	Percentage
White	74.4%
Pardo (Multiracial)	20.1%
Black	4.1%
Asian	1.3%
Amerindian	0.1%

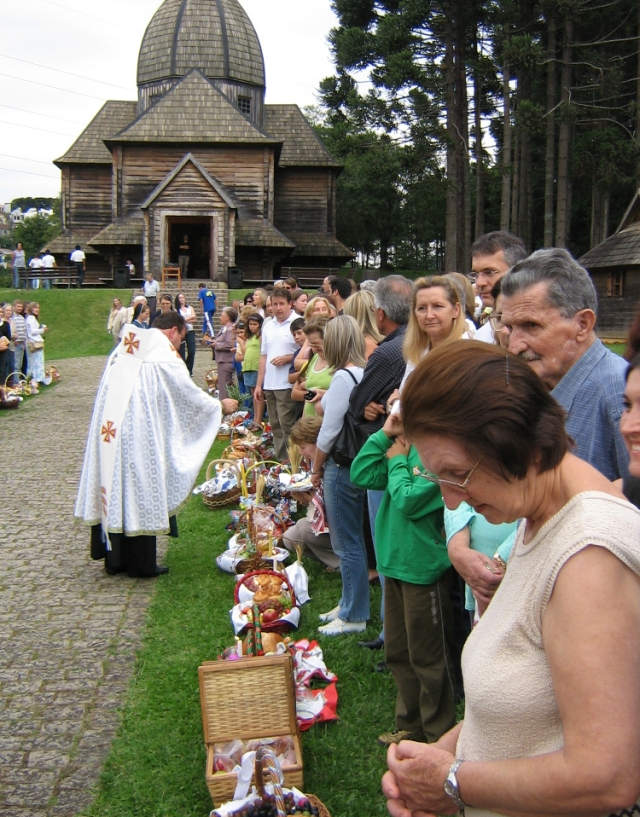
Brazilians of Ukrainian descent celebrating Easter in Curitiba

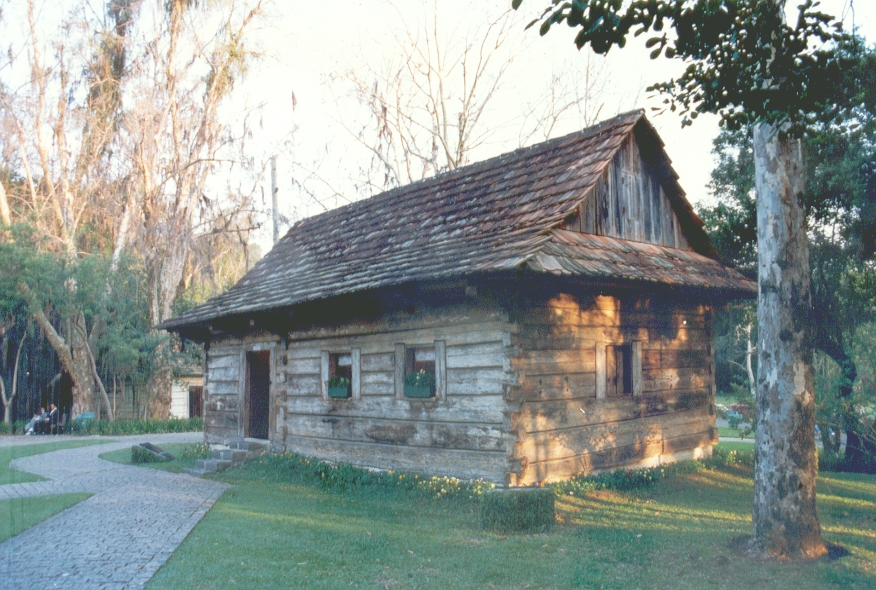
Old Polish house at João Paulo II park ("Pope John Paul II Park")

Religion in Curitiba (2010)
1. Catholic Church (62.4%)
2. Protestantism (24.0%)
3. Spiritism (2.80%)
4. Other religions (3.69%)
5. Irreligious (6.71%)

According to the 2022 census, 1,773,718 people resided in the city of Curitiba. The census revealed 1,320,252 White people (74.4%), 355,834 Pardo (Multiracial) people (20.1%), 71,948 Afro-Brazilian people (4.1%), 23,635 Asian people (1.3%), 1,976 Amerindian people (0.1%).

Curitiba is Brazil's 8th most populous city. In 2010, the city had 359,201 opposite-sex couples and 974 same-sex couples. The population of Curitiba was 52.3% female and 47.7% male.

As with most of Southern Brazil's population, Curitiba is mostly inhabited by European descendants. The first Europeans to arrive were of Portuguese origin, during the 17th century. They intermarried with the native people and with the African slaves.

Up until the 19th century, the inhabitants of the city of Curitiba were natives and mixed-race, Portuguese and Spanish immigrants. In 1808 foreigners were granted the right to ownership of land, and in 1853 Parana became an independent province, and these events resulted in a substantial number of immigrants from Europe.

The first non-Iberian (Portuguese and Spaniard) immigrants to come to the city were German.

The Memorial of Polish Immigration was inaugurated on 13 December 1980, after the visit of Pope John Paul II in June. Its area is 46,000 m^{2} (500,000 sq ft) and was part of the former Candles plant. The seven wooden log houses are parts of this memorial area, as a memento of the Polish immigrants' struggles and faith. Objects like an old wagon, pipe of cabbage and a print of the Black Madonna of Częstochowa (patron saint of the Polish people), form parts of the memorial. The first group of Poles arrived in Curitiba around 1871. Curitiba has the biggest colony of Polish immigrants in Brazil.

Italian immigrants started arriving in Brazil in 1875 and in Curitiba in 1878, coming mainly from the Veneto and Trento regions of Northern Italy. They settled mostly in the Santa Felicidade neighborhood, still a centre of the Italian community.

Nearly 20,000 Ukrainian immigrants settled there between 1895 and 1897, consisting mostly of peasants from Galicia who immigrated to Brazil to become farmers. Around 300,000 Ukrainian-Brazilians live in Paraná.

Curitiba has a Jewish community that was originally established in the 1870s. Much of the early Jewish congregation has been assimilated. In 1937 with the rise of Nazi Germany, notable German Jewish academics migrated to Brazil, some settling in Curitiba. Physicist César Lattes and former mayors Jaime Lerner and Saul Raiz were Jewish. A Holocaust memorial is present in the city. The community centre, a Jewish school, a Chabad house (Beit Chabad), three synagogues, and three Jewish cemeteries are there, one of which was defiled in 2004.

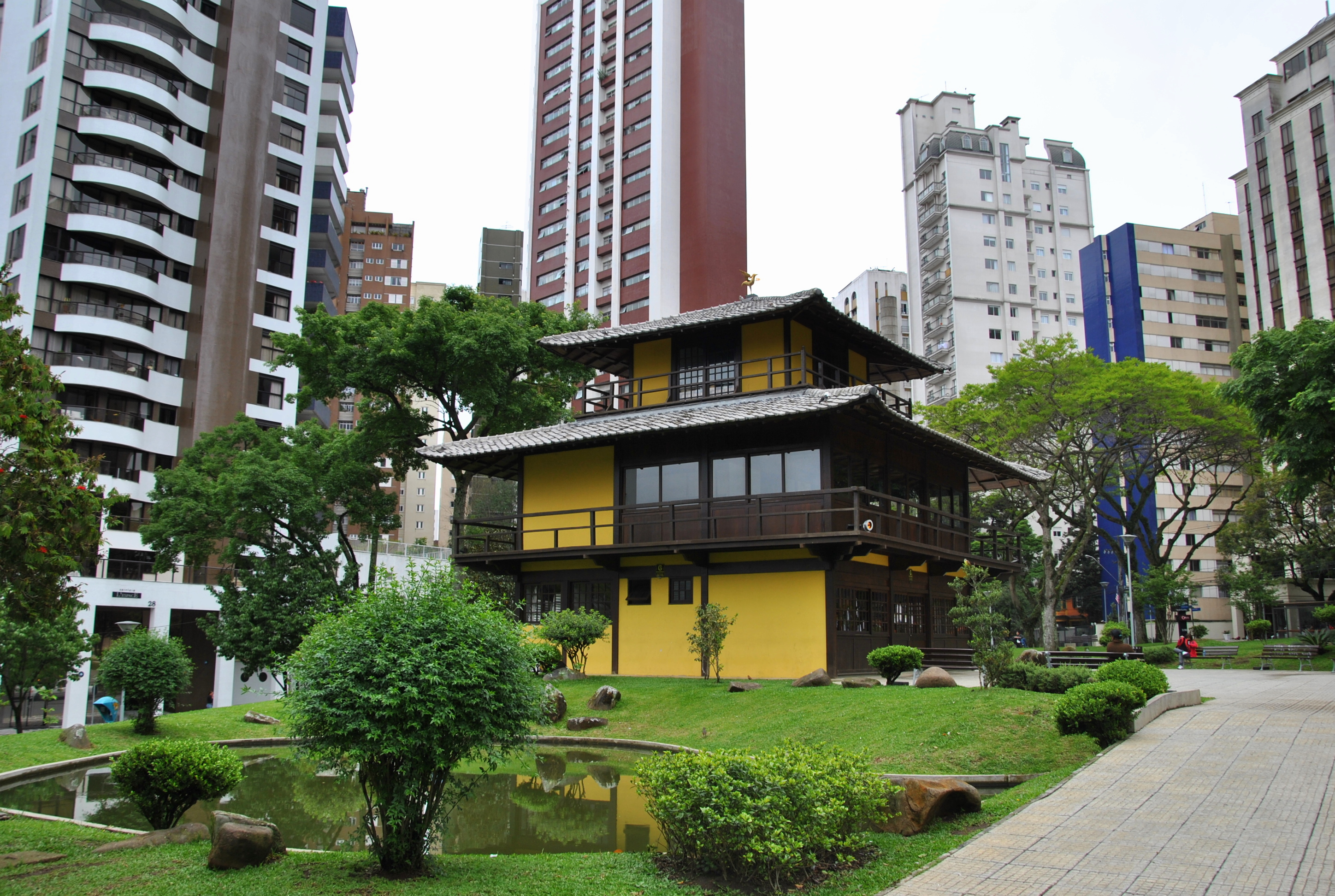
Praça do Japão (Japan Square), built in honor of Japanese immigrants

Japanese immigrants began arriving in 1915, with a larger contingent arriving in 1924. Curitiba received a significant Japanese influx. They settled mostly between Paraná and São Paulo state. The city has the second largest Japanese community in Brazil, behind only São Paulo, according to IBGE. Although both cities have around the same proportion of Japanese descendants, other large cities in the interior of the state of Paraná, such as Maringá and Londrina, have an even higher rate. Some estimates suggest that more than 40,000 Japanese-Brazilians live in Curitiba.

=== Religion ===
According to the 2010 Brazilian Census, most of the population (62.36%) is Roman Catholic, other religious groups include Protestants or evangelicals (24.03%), Spiritists (2.8%), Nones 6.71%, and people with other religions (3.69).

== Economy ==
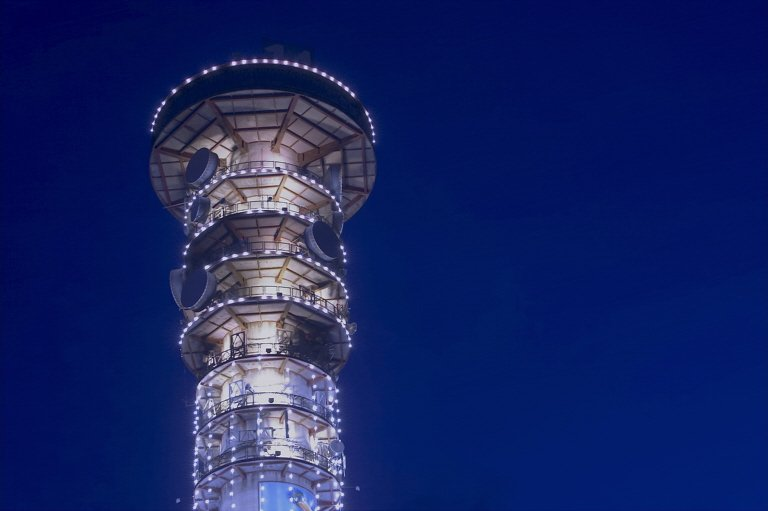
Oi Panoramic Tower

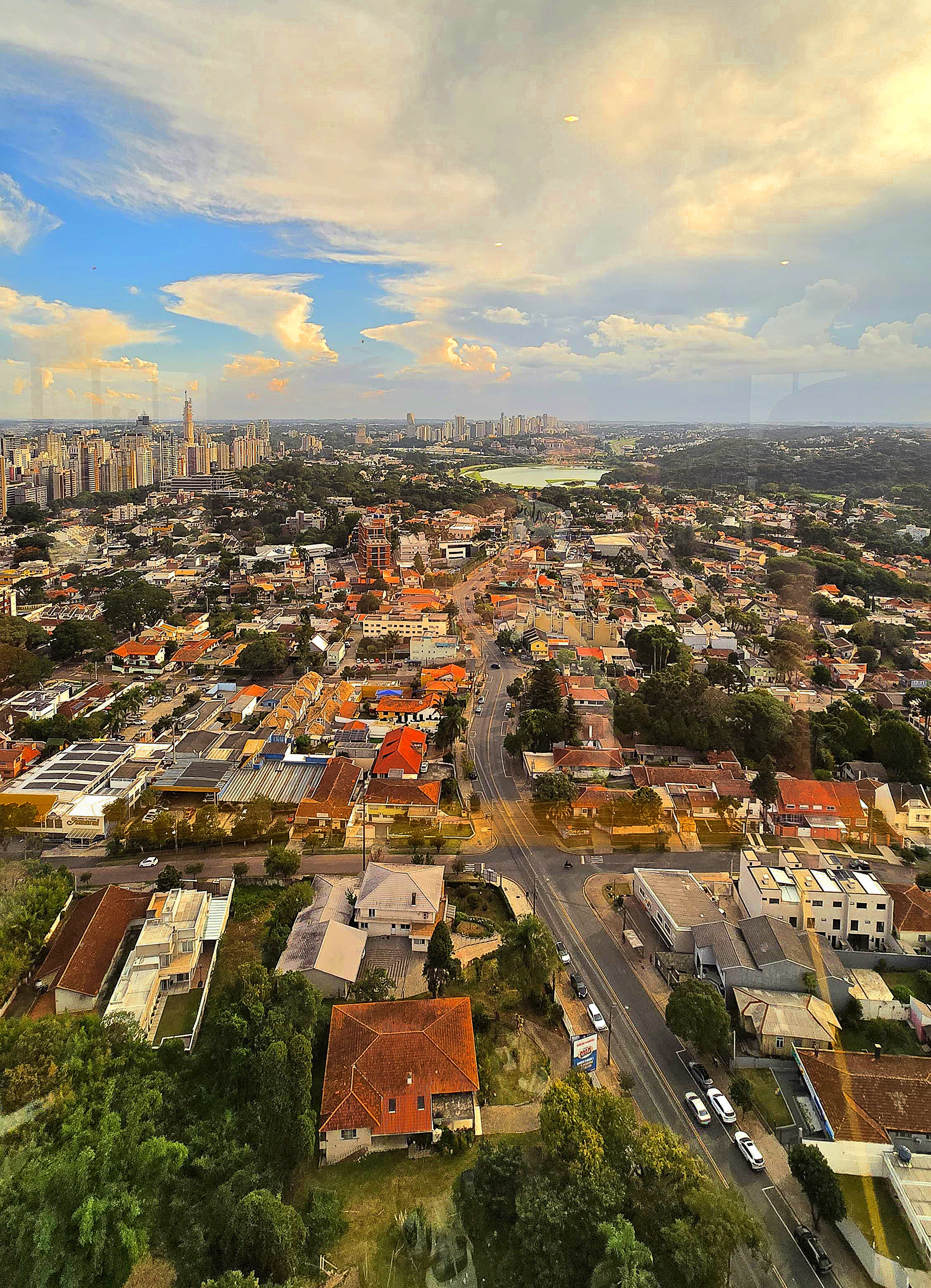
View from Panoramic Tower

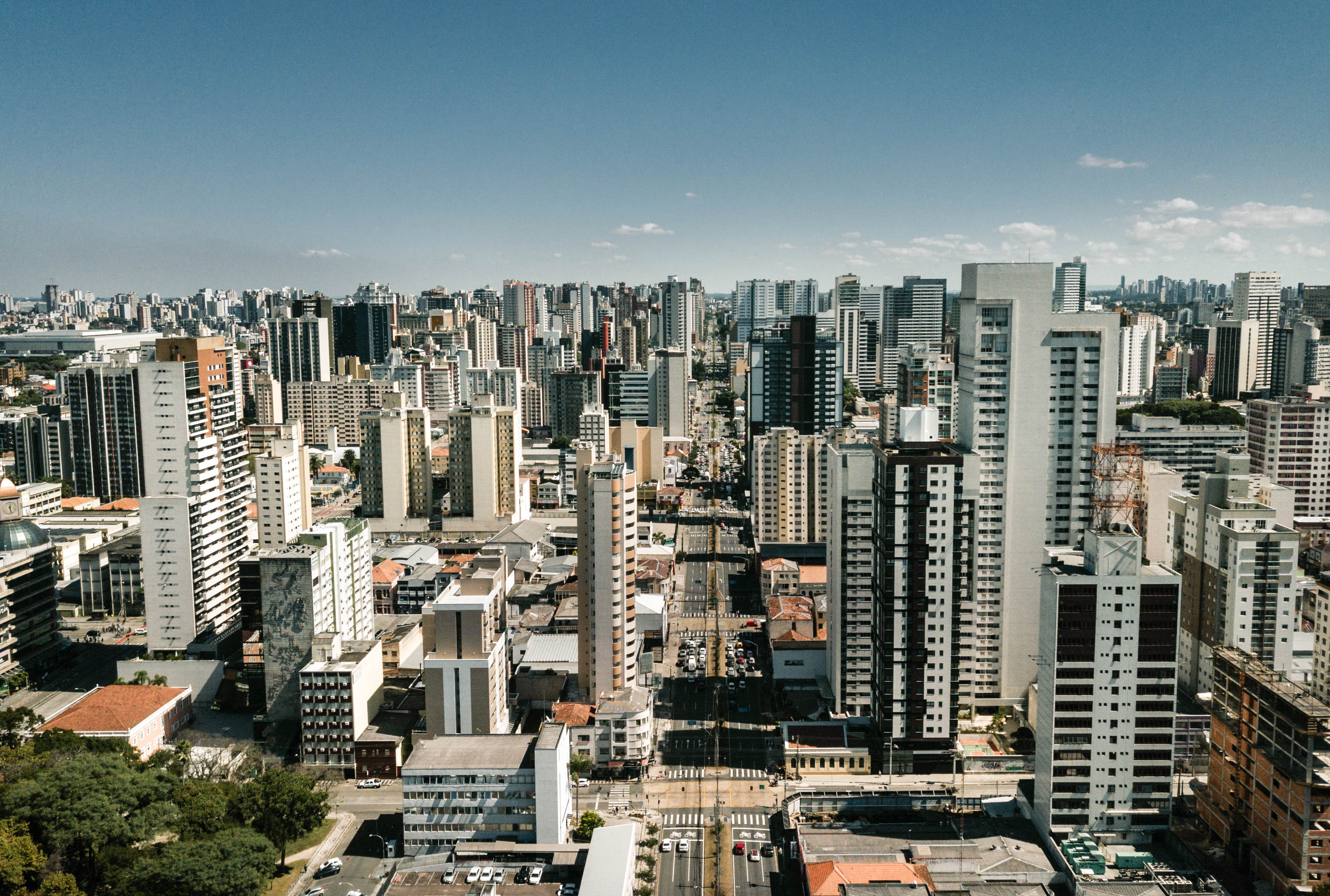
Downtown Curitiba skyline

Since it was declared capital of the State of Paraná in 1853, the city has gone through several major urban planning projects to avoid uncontrolled growth and thus has become an international role model in dealing with issues including transportation and the environment.

The city is Brazil's second largest car manufacturer. Its economy is based on industry, commerce and services. For that reason, Curitiba is considered by many investors to be the best location for investment in Brazil.

The city receives more than two million tourists every year. Most arrive via the Afonso Pena International Airport, where almost 60,000 flights land annually.

According to IPEA data, the GDP in 2006 was 32 billion reals, without including agriculture and livestock (0.03%). Industry represented 34.13% and the commerce and service sectors 65.84%. Cidade Industrial de Curitiba, the industrial district, is home to many multinational industries, such as Nissan, Renault, Volkswagen, Philip Morris, Audi, Volvo, HSBC, Siemens, ExxonMobil, Electrolux and Kraft Foods, as well as many well-known national industries, such as Sadia, O Boticário and Positivo Informática.

Curitiba's infrastructure makes bus travel fast and convenient, effectively creating demand for bus use in the same way that the infrastructure of traditional cities creates demand for private motor vehicles. In July 2001, Curitiba became Brazil's first city to receive the prize "Pole of Information Technology", granted by InfoExame magazine. According to the magazine, the companies of "Technology and Information Technology" based in Curitiba in 2001 achieved US$1.2 billion in revenues, representing a growth of 21% over the previous year.

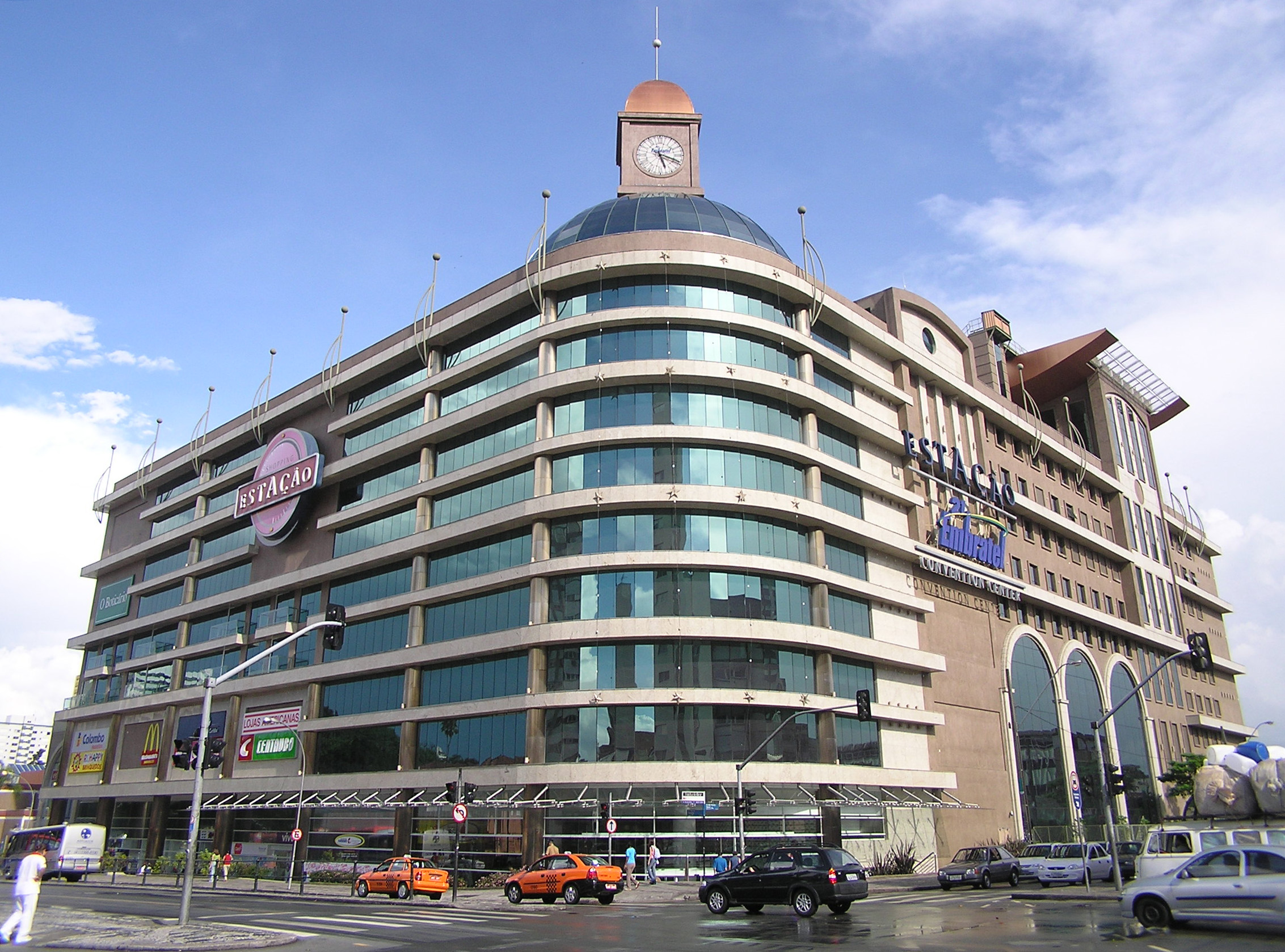
Estação Mall

The city's 30-year economic growth rate is 7.1%, higher than the national average of 4.2%, and per capita income is 66% higher than the Brazilian average. Between 1975 and 1995, Curitiba's domestic product grew by some 75% more than the entire State of Paraná, and 48% more than Brazil as a whole. In 1994, tourism generated US$280 million- 4% of the city's net income. Curitiba has municipal health, education and day care networks, neighborhood libraries shared by schools and citizens and Citizenship Streets, where buildings provide essential public services, sports and cultural facilities near transportation terminals. At the Open University, residents can take courses in subjects such as mechanics, hair styling and environmental protection for a small fee. Policies for job creation and income generation became part of the city's strategic planning in the 1990s, for the metropolitan area as well as the city.

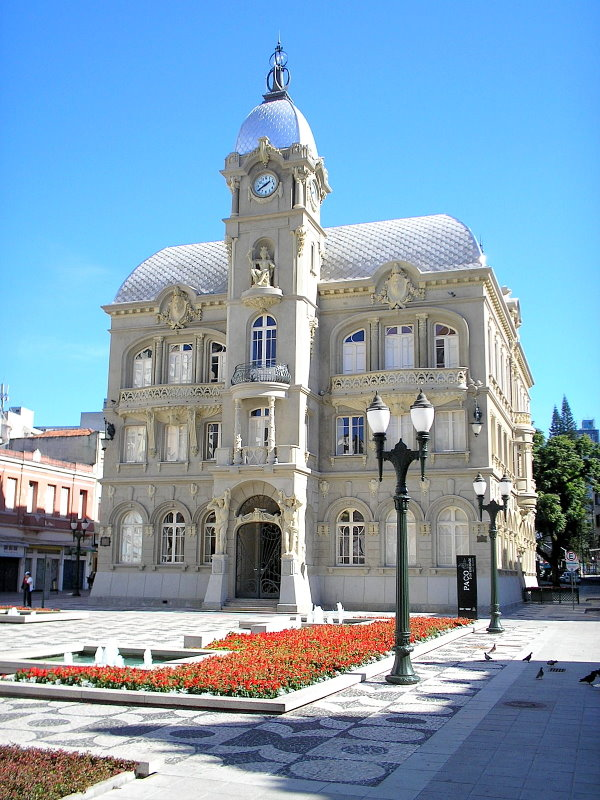
The "Paço Municipal" built in 1916

Seven large shopping malls are found in Curitiba: Mueller, Estação, Curitiba, Crystal, Palladium, Patio Batel and Park Barigüi. The Rua das Flores (Street of Flowers) is home to the majority of stores. The area is pedestrianized, with no cars around the centre. An essential element of Curitiba shopping is the Feira do Largo da Ordem, or Largo da Ordem Street Fair.

In 2008, according to IBGE Curitiba's nominal GDP was R$45.7 billion (or about of US$22.5 billion) (with R$25,934, or US$13,000, by nominal GDP per capita, about of US$5,000 more than Brazilian 2008 nominal GDP per capita), making it the fourth richest city in the country, after only São Paulo, Rio de Janeiro and the capital Brasília.

Curitiba is the second pole of technological innovation in Brazil, according to IPEA (Applied Economic Research Institute). It is Brazil's second best, and South America's fifth best, city for business, according to America Economia Magazine/2005 and 2006. The best destination for business, according to Veja Magazine of 2007. The third position among the Champions of Infrastructure, Exame Magazine of 2006. The second best city to work in Southern Brazil, according to Você S.A. Magazine of 2005. The 49th position, MasterCard Worldwide Centers of Commerce: Emerging Markets Index of 2008. One of the highlights according to the survey Offshoring Horizons performed by Watson Wyatt of 2007. One of the 10 global sustainability centres, according to Ethisphere Institute of 2008. Curitiba is also home to the largest cancer hospital in the South of Brazil, Erasto Gaertner Hospital.

== Attractions ==
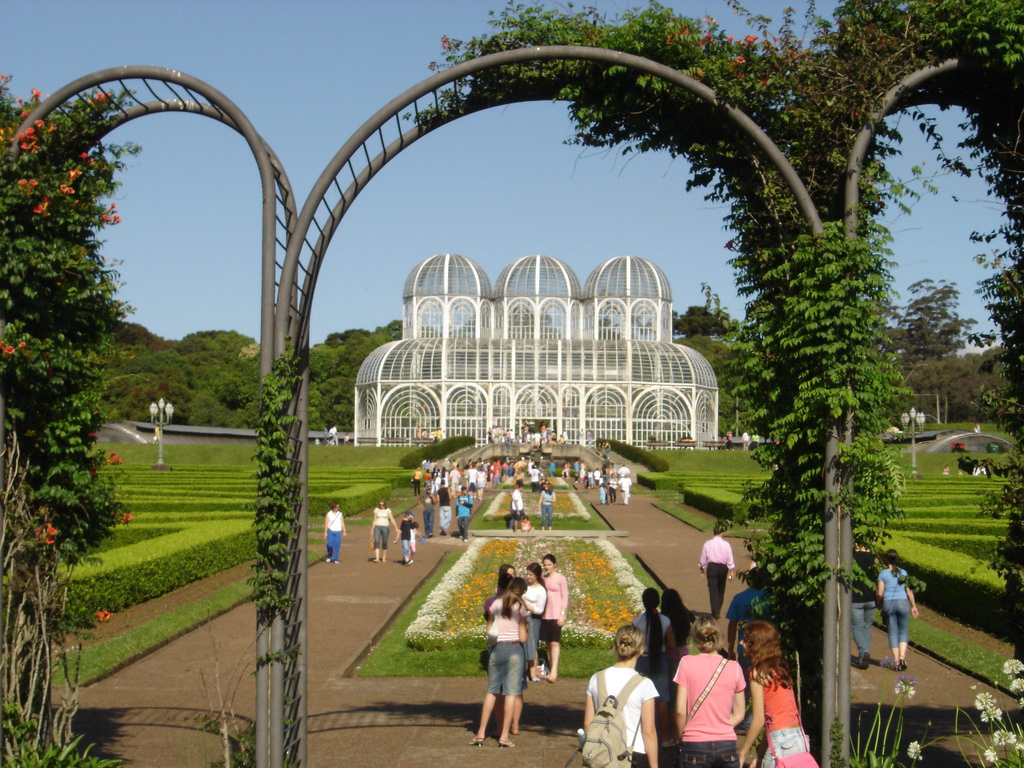
Botanical Garden of Curitiba

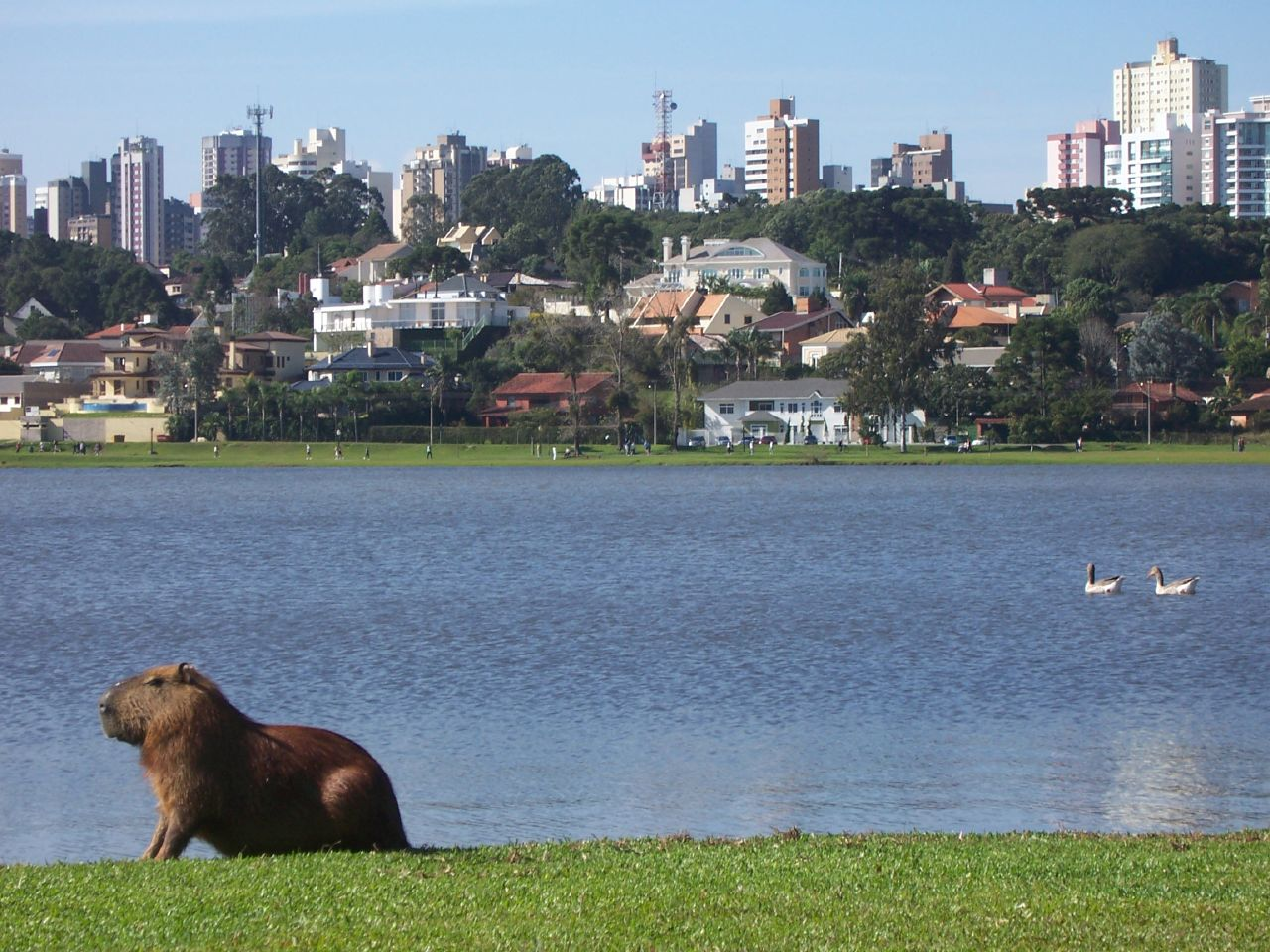
A Capybara in Barigui Park

Attractions in the city include:

- Shrine of the Divine Mercy: established by the Marian Fathers near Estrada do Ganchinho in the district of Umbará.
- Municipal market: Located near the city's central bus station, it houses numerous shops selling imported goods, organic products, and vegan food. The food court has a lot of Asian food, vegan food and organic meals.
- Italian Woods: Hosts local celebrations.
- Wire Opera House: Built on the site of an abandoned quarry.
- Oscar Niemeyer Museum: Artists from Paraná and other parts of Brazil have their work represented in the museum. Three rooms in the Eye are dedicated exclusively to photography.

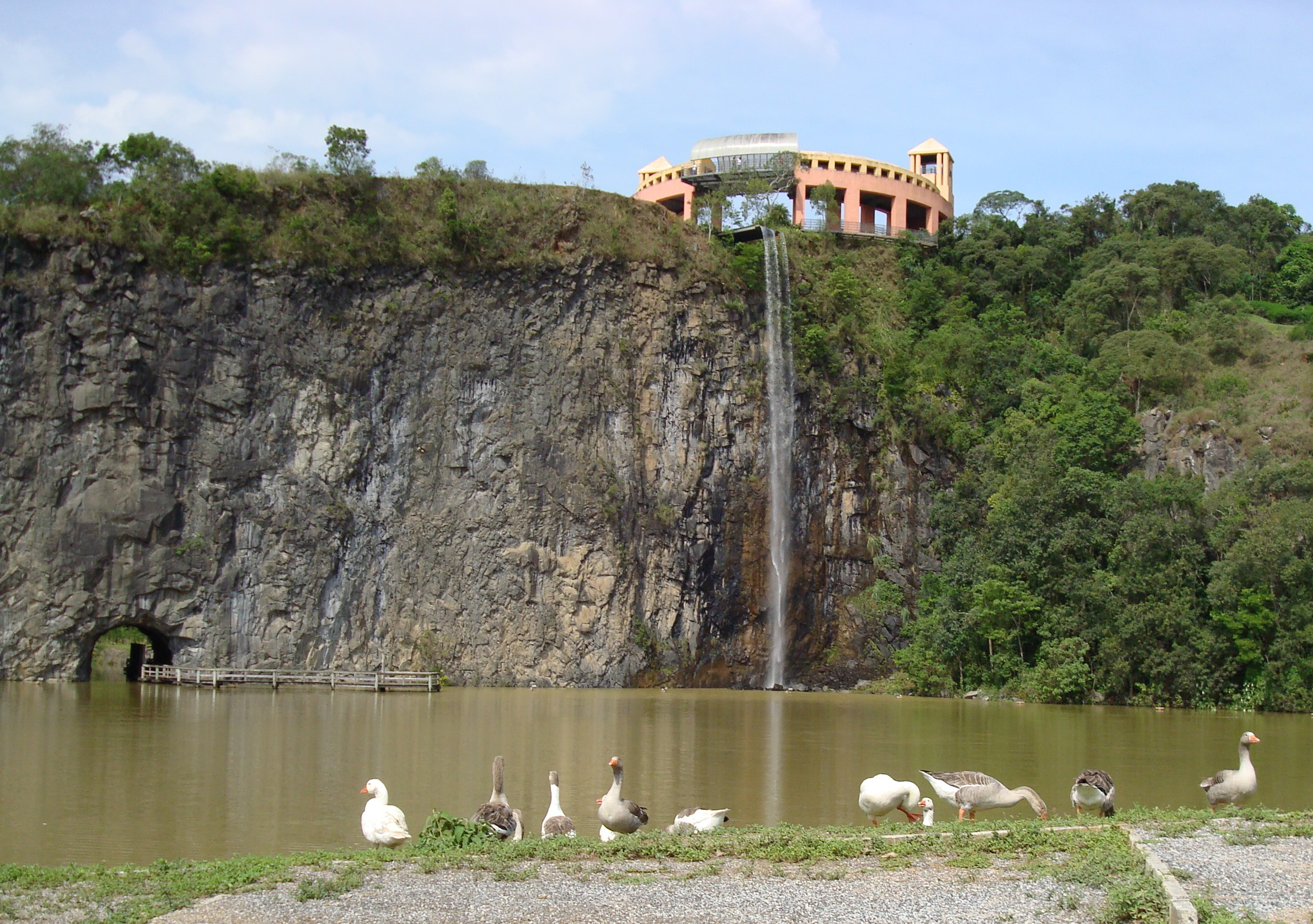
Tanguá Park

- Panoramic Tower: The 360-foot tall lookout tower allows travelers a 360° view of Curitiba and has a telephone museum on the ground floor.
- Portugal Wood: Homage to the Portuguese-Brazilian bonds, this space is highlighted by a track following a small brook, where one can see drawn on tiles excerpts from famous Portuguese language poets, as well as a tribute to the great Portuguese navigators and their discoveries. Families are often seen picnicking on the grounds.
- Curitiba International Ecological Marathon: The Maratona Ecológica Internacional de Curitiba ("Curitiba International Ecological marathon") is held in November and is known as the hardest in Brazil.
- Tourism Line: The Linha Tourismo bus stops at key tourist attractions across the city.
- Capão da Imbuia Wood

== Education ==
More than 183 universities operate in the state of Paraná.

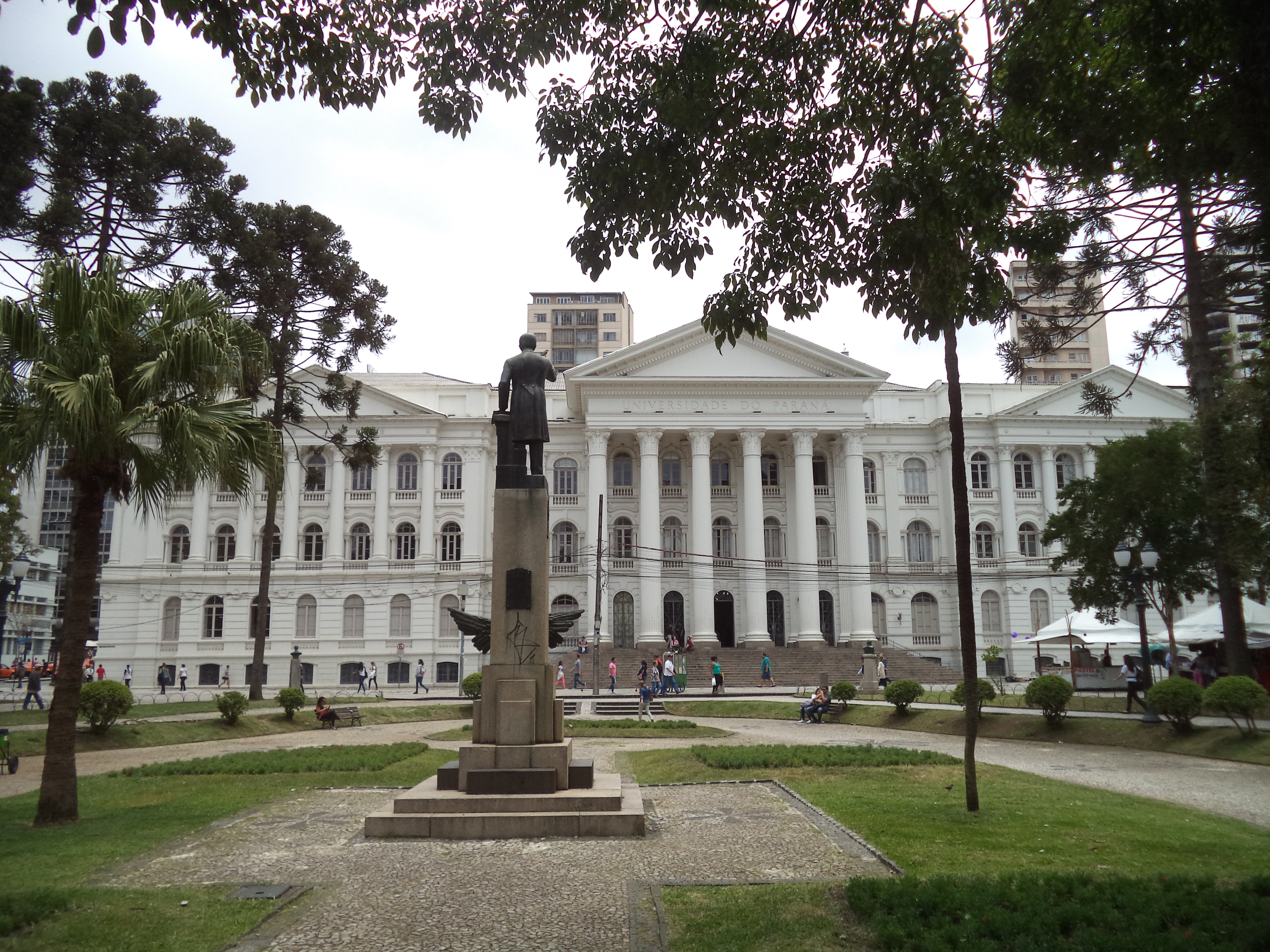
Federal University of Paraná was the first university opened in Brazil.

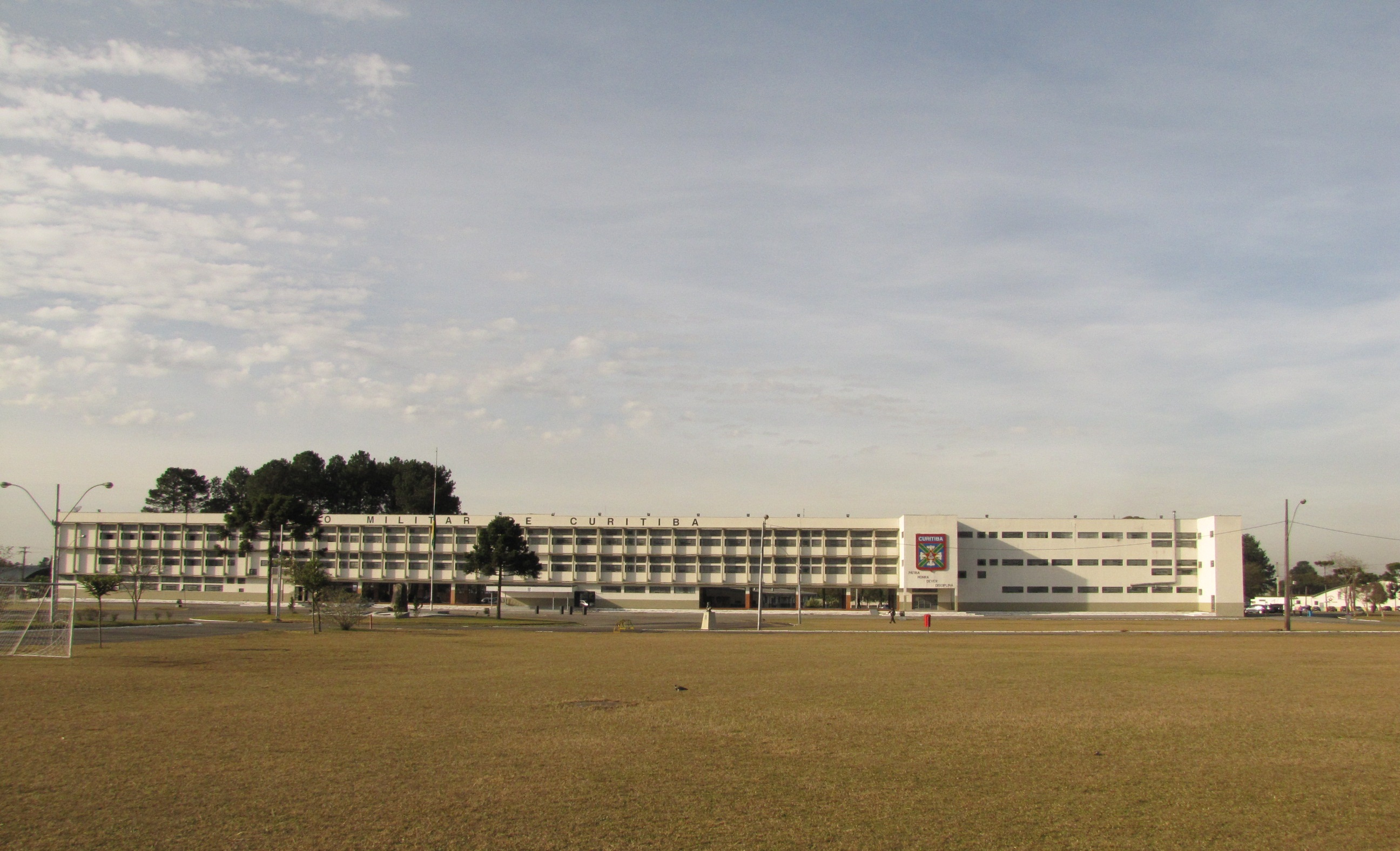
Military School of Curitiba

=== Tertiary educational institutions ===
- Universidade Federal do Paraná (UFPR) – Federal University of Paraná – This federal university is the largest of Paraná, with more than 35.000 students. The first university of Brazil;
- Universidade Tecnológica Federal do Paraná (UTFPR) – Federal Technologic University of Parana is the first university of technology from Brazil;
- Instituto Federal de Educação, Ciência e Tecnologia do Paraná – Paraná Federal Institute of Education, Science and Technology;
- Universidade Positivo (UP) – Positivo University, private institution;
- Universidade Estadual do Paraná (UNESPAR) – State University of Paraná, which includes EMBAP (Paraná School of Fine Arts) and FAP (College of Arts of Paraná);
- Pontifícia Universidade Católica do Paraná (PUCPR) – Pontifical Catholic University of Parana – A major private university;
- ESIC Business and Marketing School – International Website ESIC
- Centro Universitário Curitiba (UNICURITIBA) – University Center Curitiba, old Law School of Curitiba.
- Centro Universitário Internacional (UNINTER)
- Fundação de Estudos Sociais do Paraná (FESPPR) – The First Economy Graduation in Paraná, since 1938

=== Educational system ===
In the 1990s, the city started a project called Faróis do Saber ("Lighthouses of Knowledge"). These libraries are free educational centres that include libraries, free Internet access and other cultural resources. Libraries work with municipal schools, offering a collection of approximately 5000 books, and provide cultural reference and leisure.

Among Brazilian capitals, Curitiba has the highest literacy rate, and ranks number 1 in education among the Brazilian capitals.

== Urban planning ==
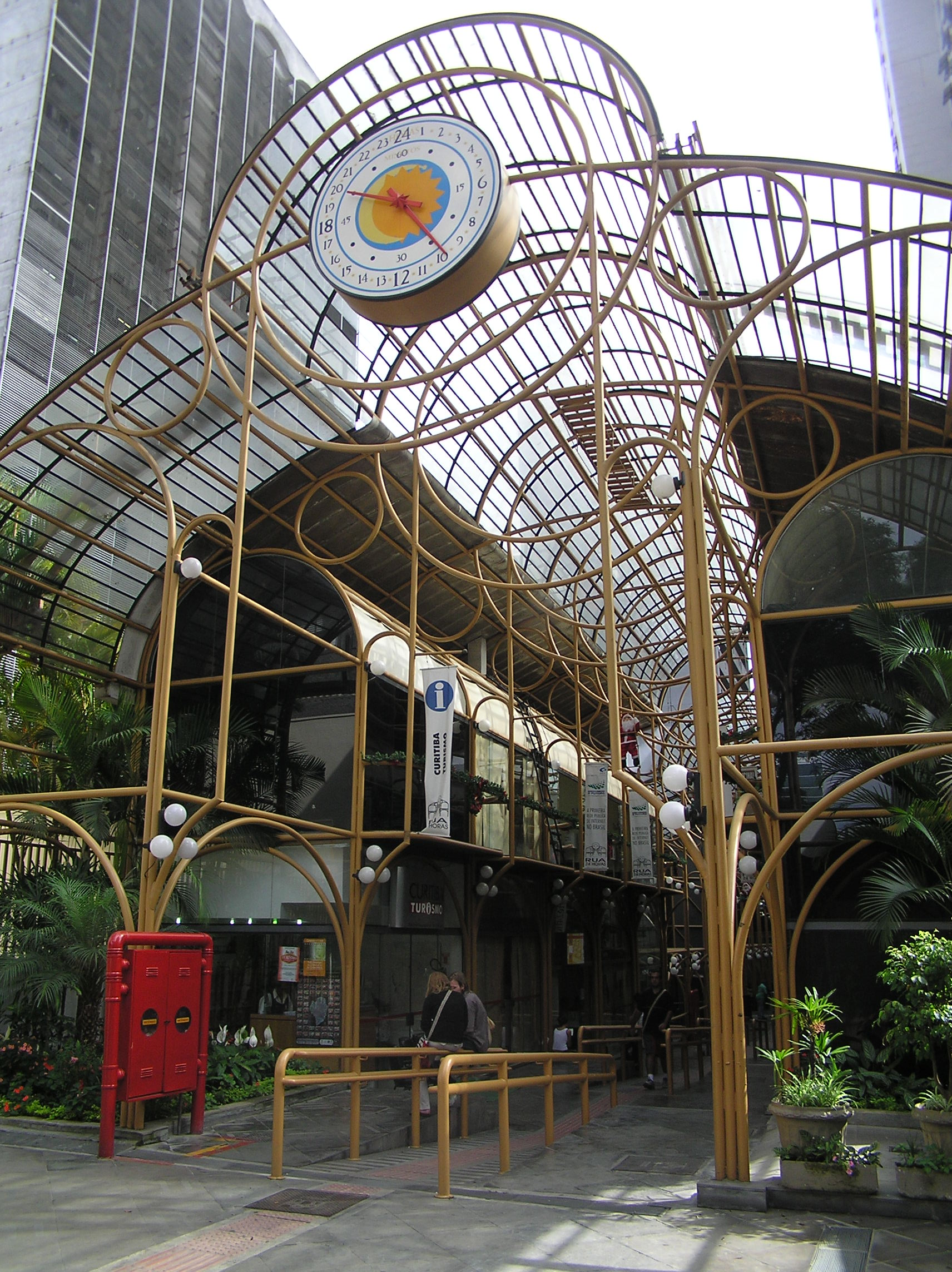
Entrance of 24 Hours Street

Curitiba has a planned transportation system, which includes lanes on major streets devoted to a bus rapid transit system. The buses are split into three sections (bi-articulated) and stop at designated elevated tubes, complete with access for disabled riders. Buses charge one price regardless of distance.

The city preserves and cares for its green areas, boasting 51.5 m^{2} (554 sq ft) of green space per inhabitant.

In the 1940s and 1950s, Alfred Agache, cofounder of the French Society for Urban Studies, was hired to produce the first city plan. It emphasised a star of boulevards, with public amenities downtown, an industrial district and sanitation. The plan was too expensive to complete.

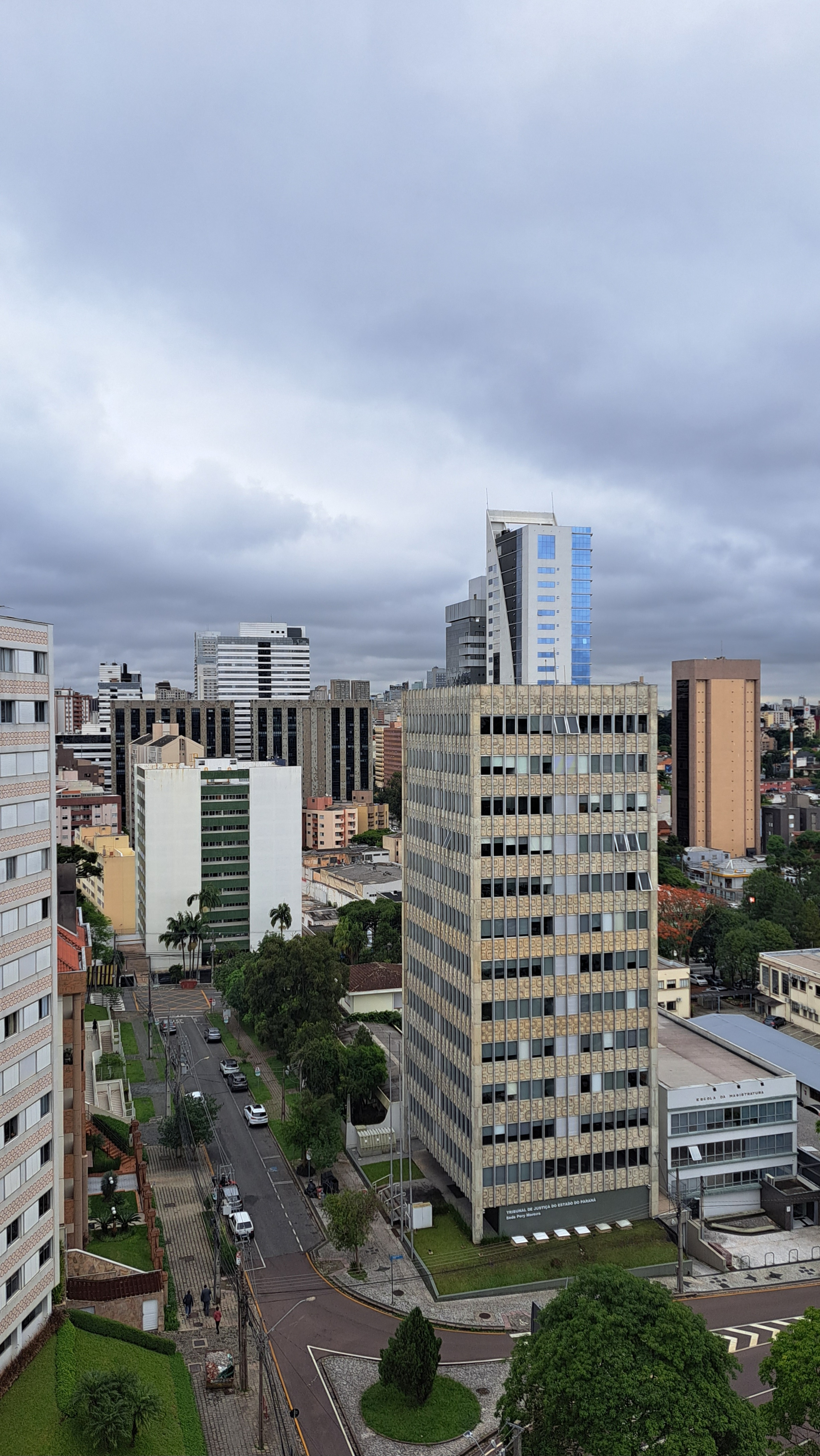
Civic Center skyline in Curitiba, with many administrative and commercial buildings

By the 1960s, Curitiba's population had reached 430,000. Some residents feared that the growth in population threatened to damage the character of the city. In 1964, Mayor Ivo Arzua solicited proposals for urban design. Architect Jaime Lerner, who later became mayor, led a team from the Universidade Federal do Paraná that suggested strict controls on urban sprawl, reduced traffic in the downtown area, preservation of Curitiba's Historic Sector and a convenient and affordable public transit system.

This plan, known as the Curitiba Master Plan, was adopted in 1968. Lerner closed XV de Novembro St. to vehicles, because it had high pedestrian traffic. The plan had a new road design to minimise traffic: the Trinary Road System. This used two one-way streets moving in opposite directions that surround a smaller, two-lane street where the express buses have an exclusive lane. Five of these roads form a star that converges on the city centre. Land farther from these roads is zoned for lower density development, to pull traffic away from the main roads. In a number of areas subject to floods, buildings were condemned and the land became parks.

Today, Curitiba is considered one of the world's best examples of urban planning. In June 1996, the chairman of the Habitat II summit of mayors and urban planners in Istanbul praised Curitiba as "the most innovative city in the country".

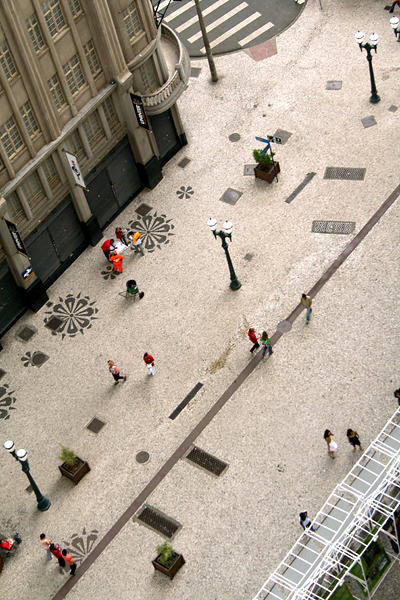
15 November Street

Curitiba was recently recommended by UNESCO as a model for the reconstruction of the cities of Afghanistan. In the 1980s, the RIT (Rede Integrada de Transporte, Integrated Transport Network) was created. At the same time, the city began building the "Faróis de Saber" (Lighthouses of Knowledge) educational centres. The city has more than 400 km^{2} (154 sq mi) of public parks and forests.

In 2007, the city placed third in a list of "15 Green Cities" in the world, according to Grist magazine, after Reykjavík in Iceland and Portland, Oregon in the United States. As a result, according to one survey, 99% of Curitibans are happy with their hometown.

Jaime Lerner suggests urban acupuncture as the future solution for contemporary urban issues; focusing on very narrow pressure points in cities, can create positive ripple effects. Urban "acupuncture" reclaims land for the public and emphasizes the importance of community development through small interventions in design of cities. It emphasises pinpoint interventions that can be accomplished quickly to create an immediate impact.

The "capacity building job line" was created to accelerate economic development. About 15,000 new jobs were generated by 2013.

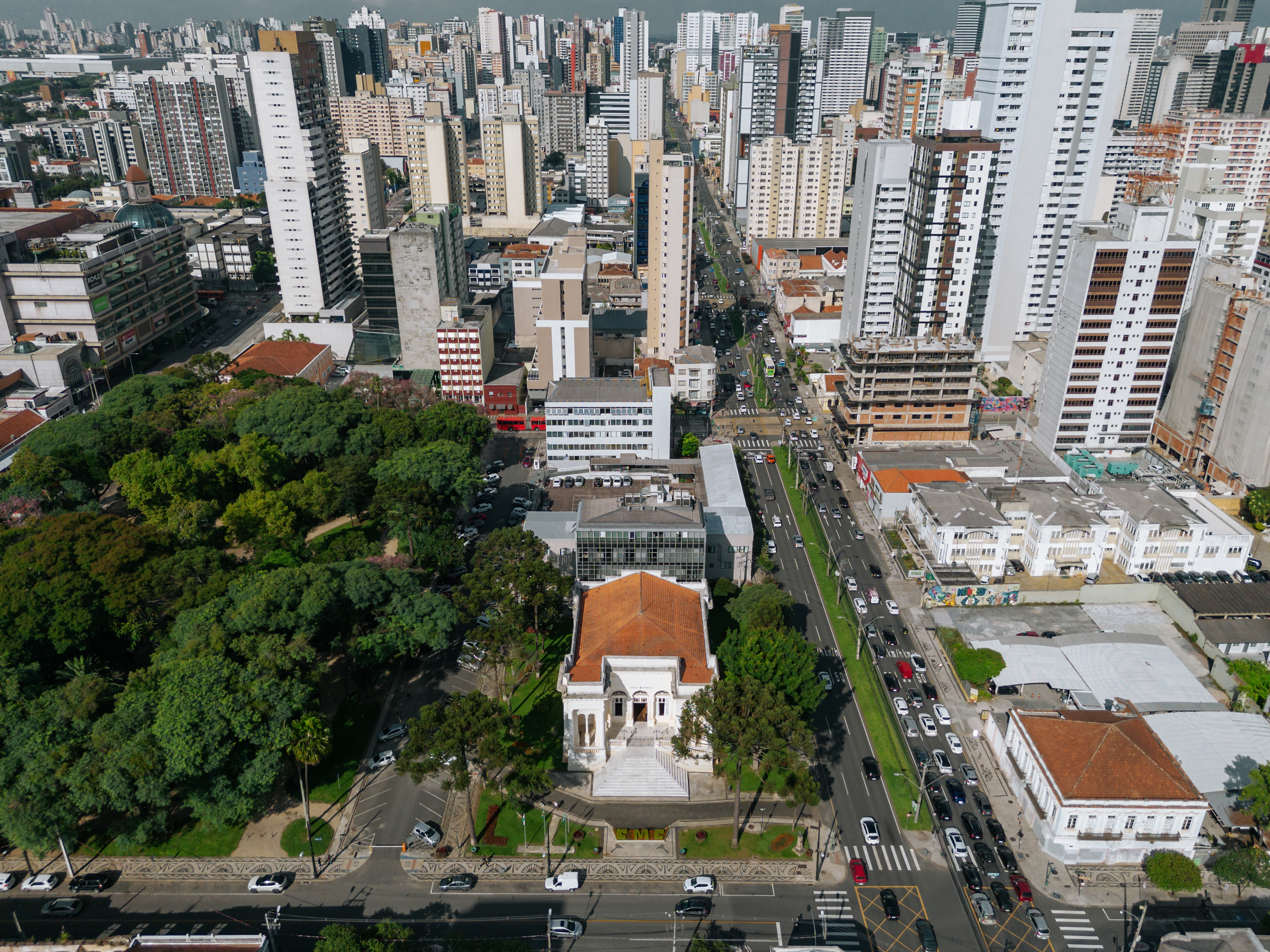
Aerial view of Curitiba

According to Jonas Rabinovitch, a United Nations senior adviser and former planner at the Curitiba Research and Urban Planning Institute (IPPUC), up to 8% of Curitiba's population still lived in favelas as of 2016. According to 2010 census data collected by IBGE, 49,700 homes in Curitiba form part of irregular settlements. This is equivalent to 163,300 people. The population growth of favelas was 12.4% between 2000 and 2010, higher than the population in general (10.3%).

For transportation, Curitiba has over 2 million people travel by bus while the city also has the most cars per capita in Brazil.

== Culture ==
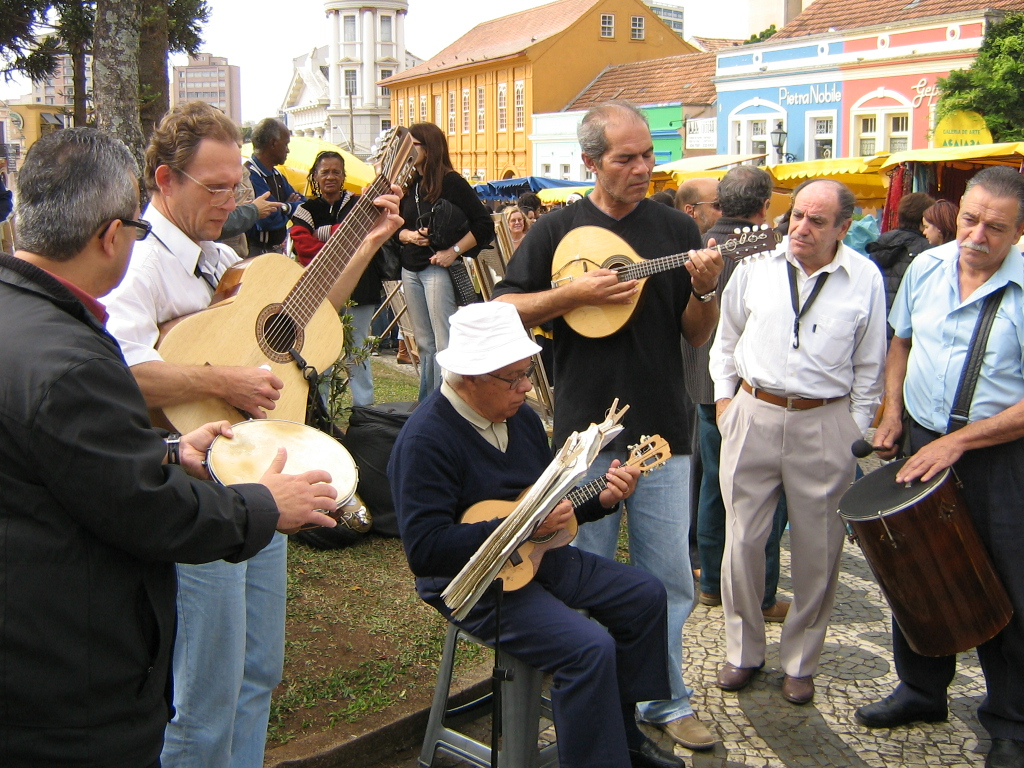
Musicians in Feirinha do largo da ordem

In January 1973 the Fundação Cultural de Curitiba was set up, with the aim of promoting culture.

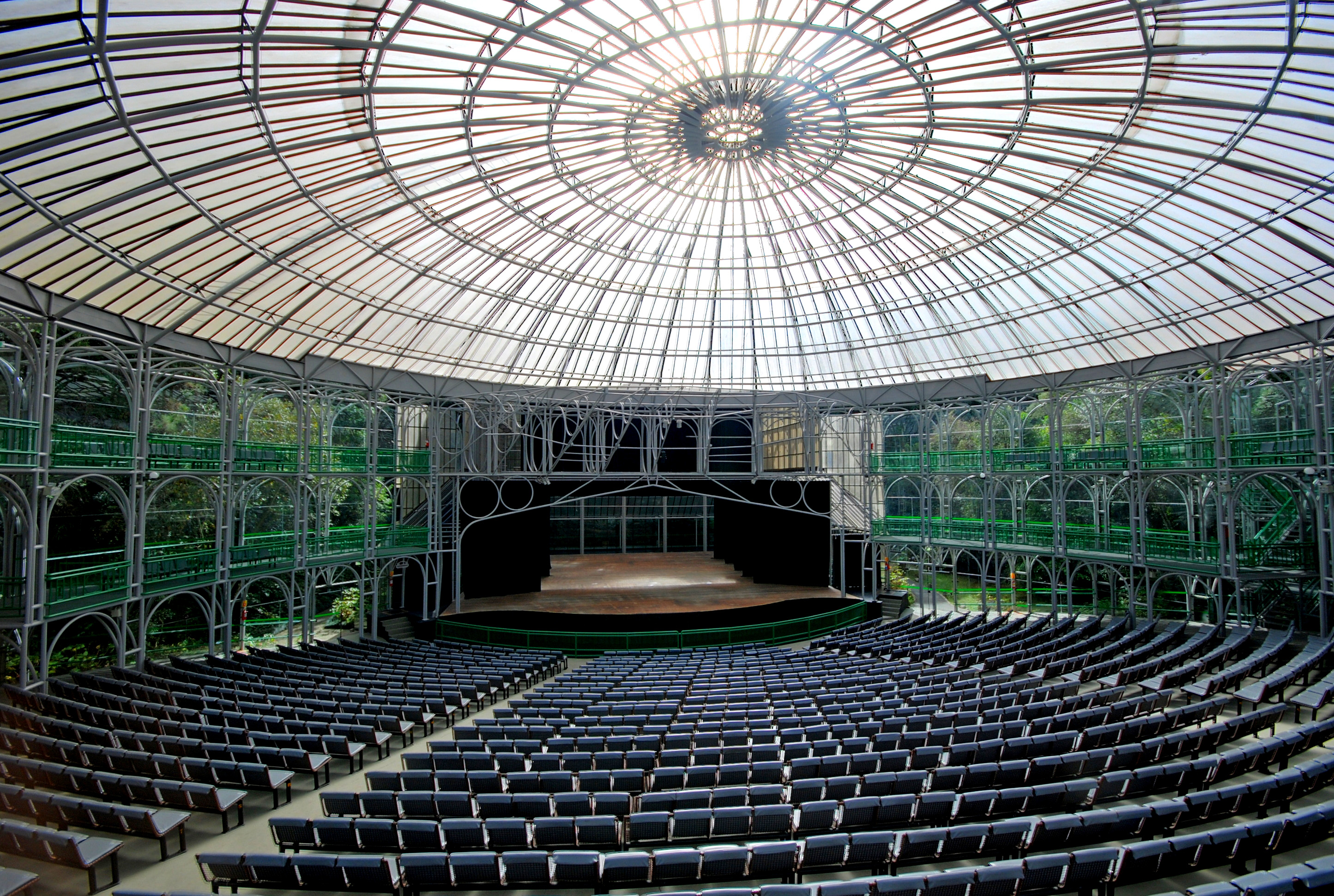
Wire Opera House

The Cultural Complex Solar do Barão features the Photography Museum, the Engravings Museum and the Posters Museu. The MuMA – Museu Metropolitano de Arte (Museum of Metropolitan Art) displays artists from the state of Paraná as well as renowned Brazilian painters such as Pancetti, Guignard and Di Cavalcanti.

The Polish Immigrants Memorial, also known as The Pope's Woods, features an area surrounded by trees. The Polish Pope John Paul II blessed the first replica of the traditional Polish houses that make up the Bosque do Papa when he visited the city in 1980.

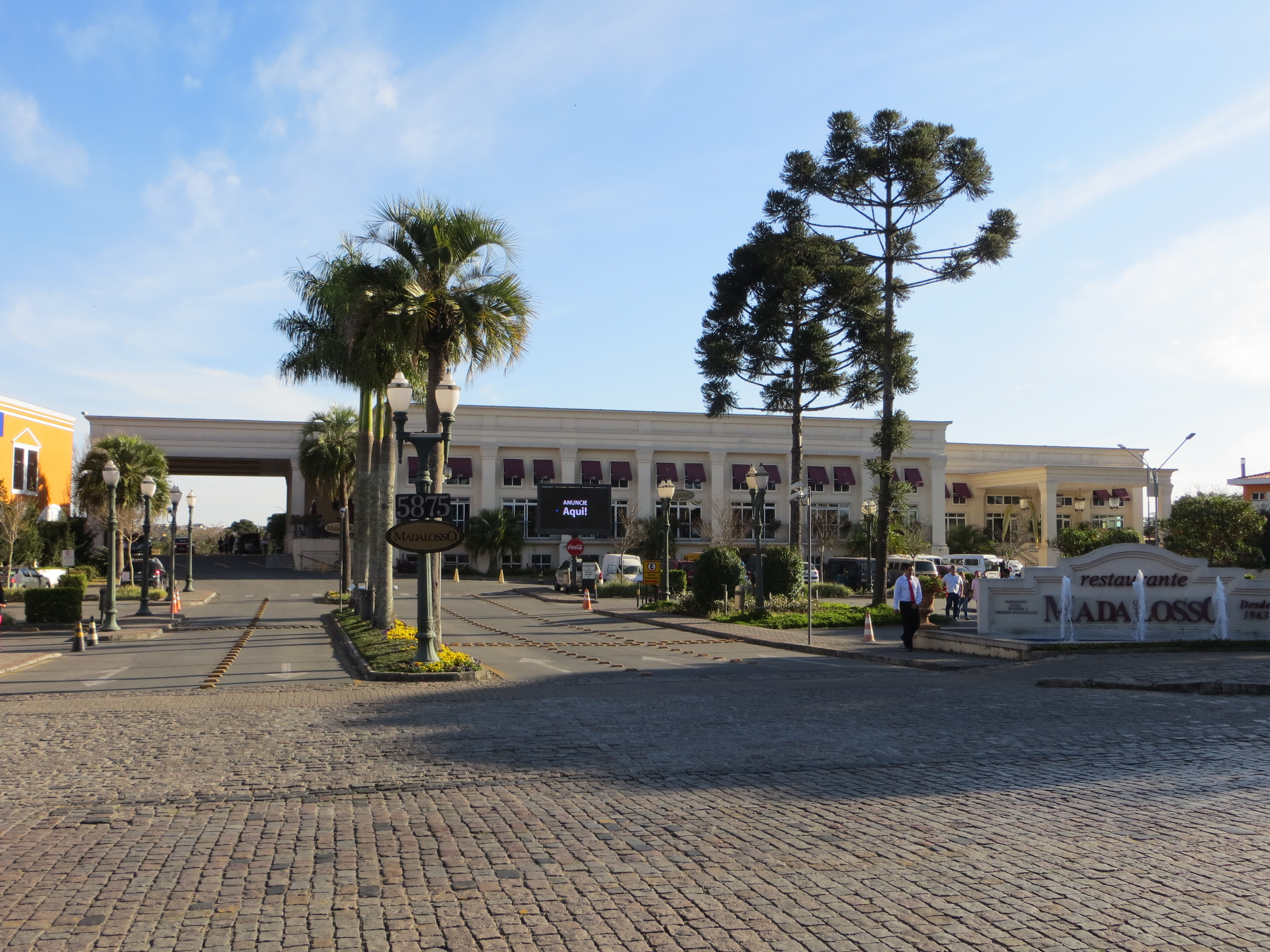
Restaurante Madalosso - one of the largest restaurants in the world

In 2003, Curitiba received the "American Capital of Culture" title, granted by the OAS (Organization of American States). The city is also recognized as a "Design City" by UNESCO's Creative Cities Network.

=== Gastronomy ===
The capital of Paraná is an important gastronomic center in Brazil, and the typical foods of Curitiba tend be very different when compared to other common Brazilian dishes. The dishes of the local cuisine are a reflection of the history of the municipality and the typical foods. Curitiba's cuisine has mainly been influenced by Italian, Polish and German immigrants.

Curitiba is the home of the largest restaurant in the Americas, and one of the world's largest restaurants, Restaurante Madalosso. Madalosso can feed more than 4,600 diners at a time in its 10 dining rooms, all named after Italian cities.

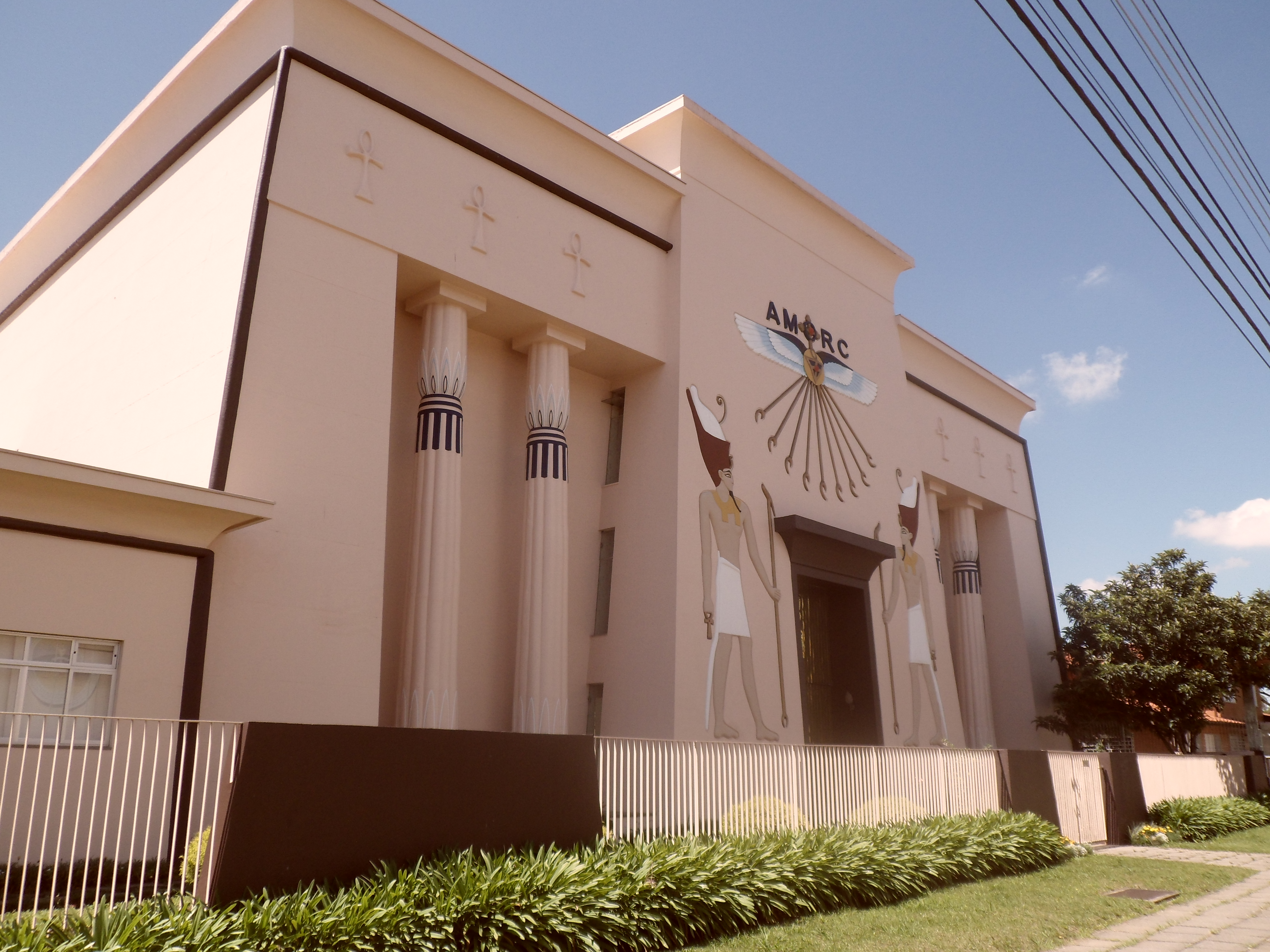
Egyptian Museum and Rosicrucianism

=== Arts and entertainment ===
Curitiba was Brazil's first city to have an IMAX movie theatre. Curitiba has many theaters. The largest and most important one is the Guaíra Theater. Every year, in April, it hosts the Curitiba Theater Festival.

=== Museums ===
Brazilian architect Oscar Niemeyer designed the extravagant state museum of Curitiba.

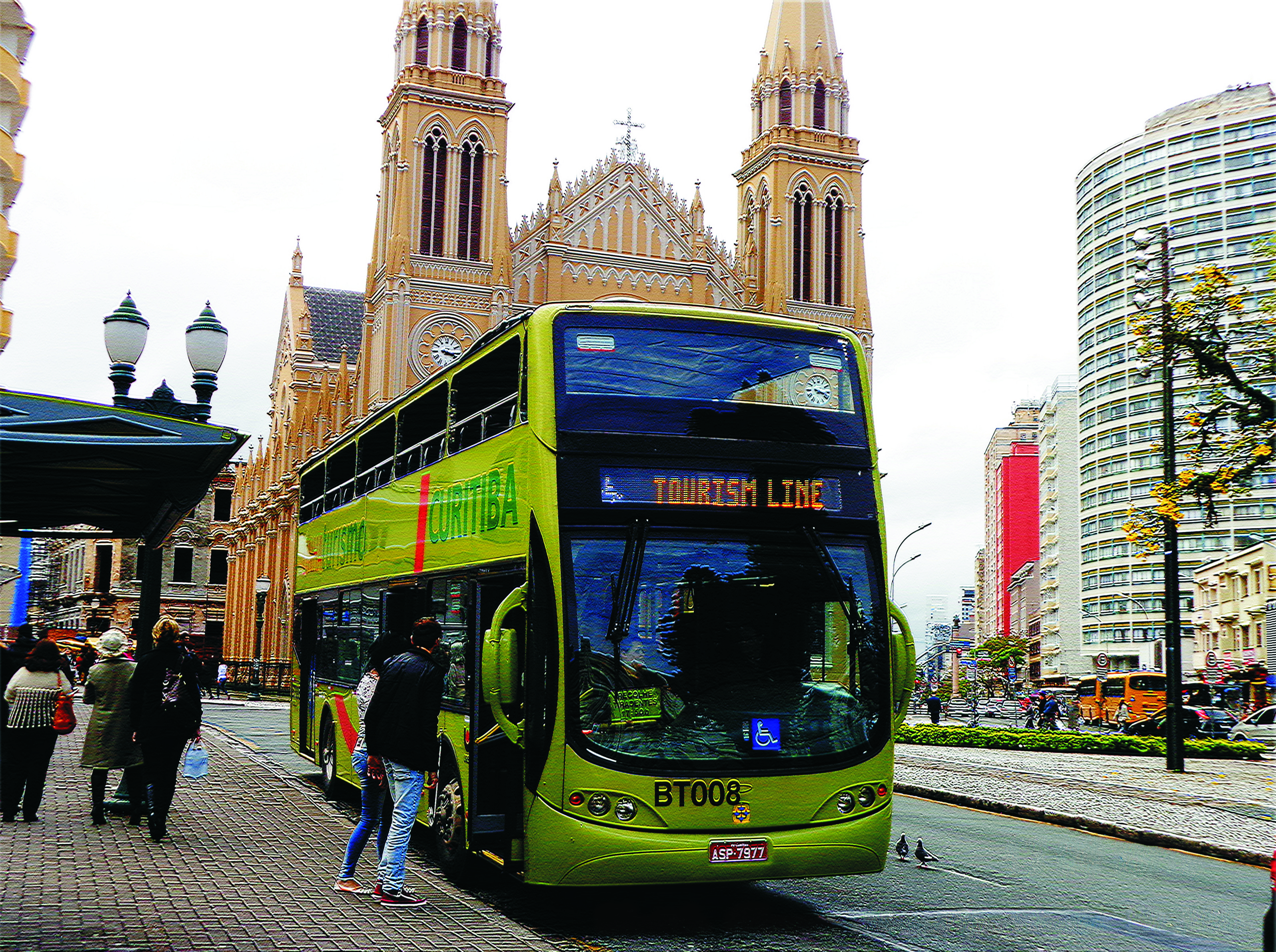
Tourism bus line in Curitiba

- Museu Paranaense ("Paranaense Museum") – dedicated to arts and history;
- Oscar Niemeyer Museum – the largest museum of South America, dedicated to plastic arts;
- Museu de Arte Sacra ("Religious Art Museum") – the focus is Christian art;
- Museu do Expedicionário ("Museum of the Expeditionary") – dedicated to Brazilian participation in World War II;
- Museu de Arte Contemporânea ("Museum of Contemporary Art");
- Museu da Imagem e do Som ("Image and Sound Museum") – about cinema, photography and music;
- Egyptian and Rosicrucian Museum;
- Museu Metropolitano de Arte de Curitiba ("Metropolitan Museum of Art in Curitiba") – modern art;
- Museu de História Natural ("Natural History Museum") – biology and botany.
- Museu do Holocausto ("Holocaust Museum")

=== Festivals ===
Curitiba has yearly festivals related to arts, such as Curitiba Theatre Festival and the Music Workshop of Curitiba. Others celebrate immigrants festivals, such as the Grape Feast ("Festa da Uva"), which is related to Italian immigrants, and the four Matsuri, related to Japanese immigrants.

The four Matsuri set in Curitiba are: Imin Matsuri (Japanese: 移民祭り, "Immigration Festival") which celebrates the arrival of Japanese immigrants in Brazil, Haru Matsuri (Japanese: 春祭り, "Spring Festival") which celebrates the end of winter and coming of spring, Hana Matsuri (Japanese: 花祭り, "Flower Festival"), which celebrates the birth of Sakyamuni, and Seto Matsuri ("Seto Festival"), in honor of Cláudio Seto, comic artist, precursor of the manga in Brazil and idealist of the first Matsuri in Curitiba.

Curitiba also hold the famous Psycho Carnival, a three-day festival that happens during the Brazilian Carnival, but devoted to psychobilly and rockabilly genres, attracting people from all over the world. In the same occasion the Zombie Walk also happens. The 2016 edition took more than 20,000 people to the streets.

=== UN Convention on Biodiversity ===
On 20–31 March 2006 the Convention on biodiversity took place in Pinhais (a city near Curitiba), addressing items of the 1993 Convention on Biological Diversity adopted by 188 countries.

== Transportation ==
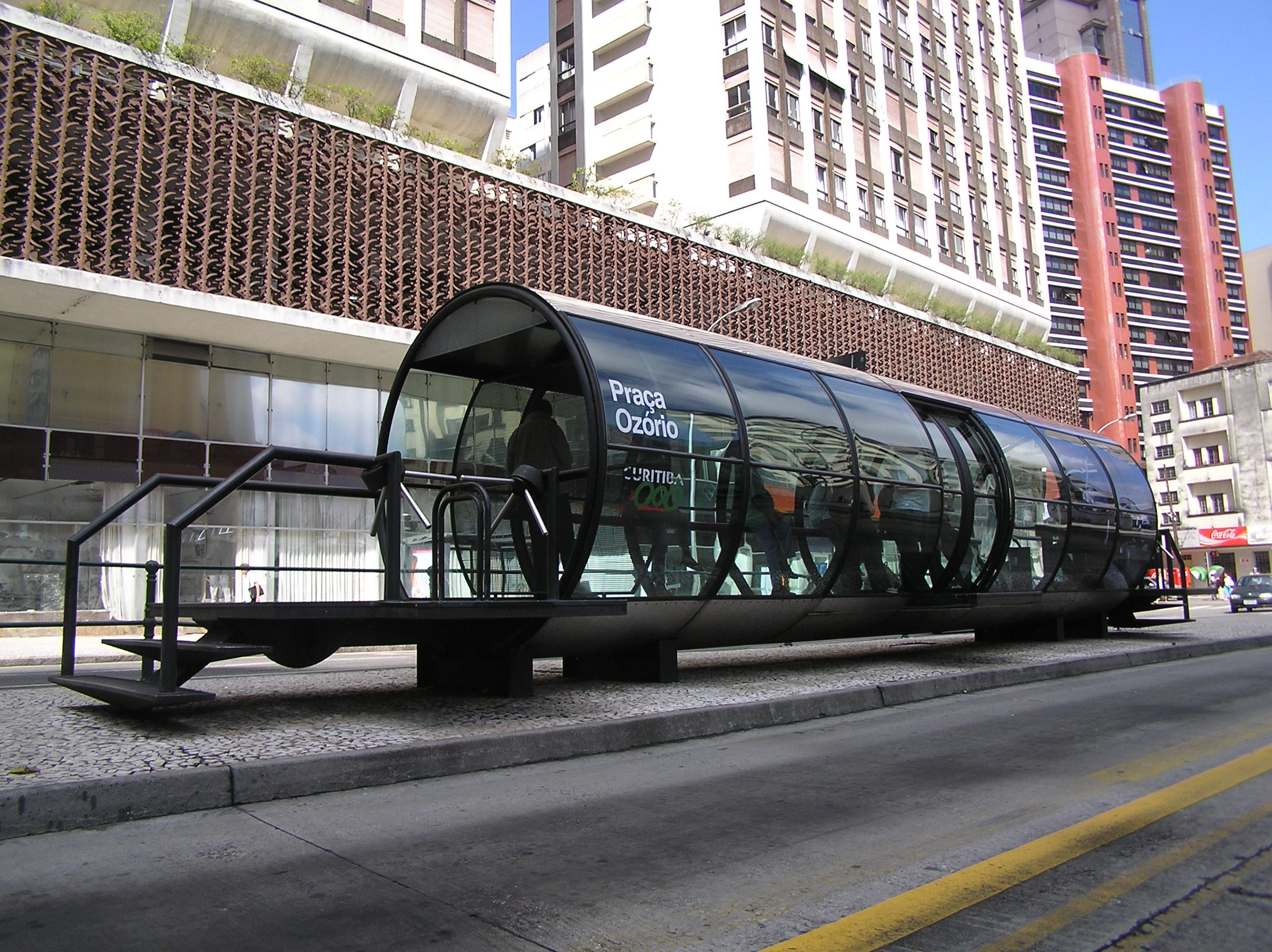
Estação Tubo Praça Osório, one of the tube-shaped bus stops in Curitiba

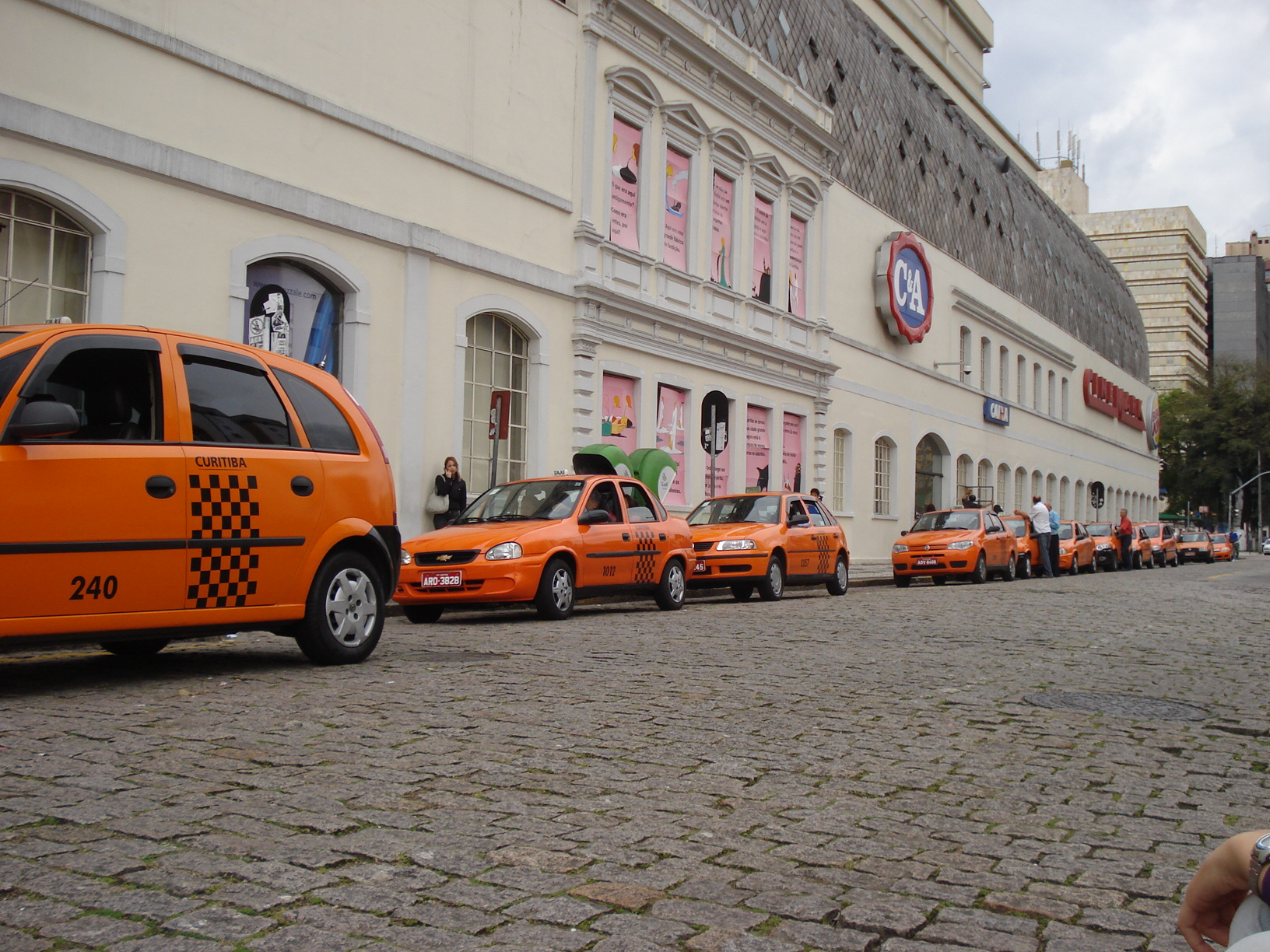
The orange taxis of Curitiba

=== Public transport ===
Curitiba's public transportation consists entirely of buses. It opened the world's second bus rapid transit (BRT) system, Rede Integrada de Transporte, in 1974. The popularity of Curitiba's BRT has effected a modal shift from automobile travel to bus travel. Based on 1991 traveler survey results, it was estimated that the introduction of the BRT had caused a reduction of about 27 million auto trips per year, annually saving about 27 million liters of fuel. In particular, 28 percent of BRT riders previously traveled by car. Compared to eight other Brazilian cities of its size, Curitiba uses about 30 percent less fuel per capita, resulting in one of the country's lowest rates of ambient air pollution. Some 1,100 buses make 12,500 trips every day, serving more than 1.3 million passengers, 50 times the number from 20 years ago. Eighty percent of travelers use the express or direct bus services. Curitibanos spend only about 10 percent of their income on transportation, far below the national average.

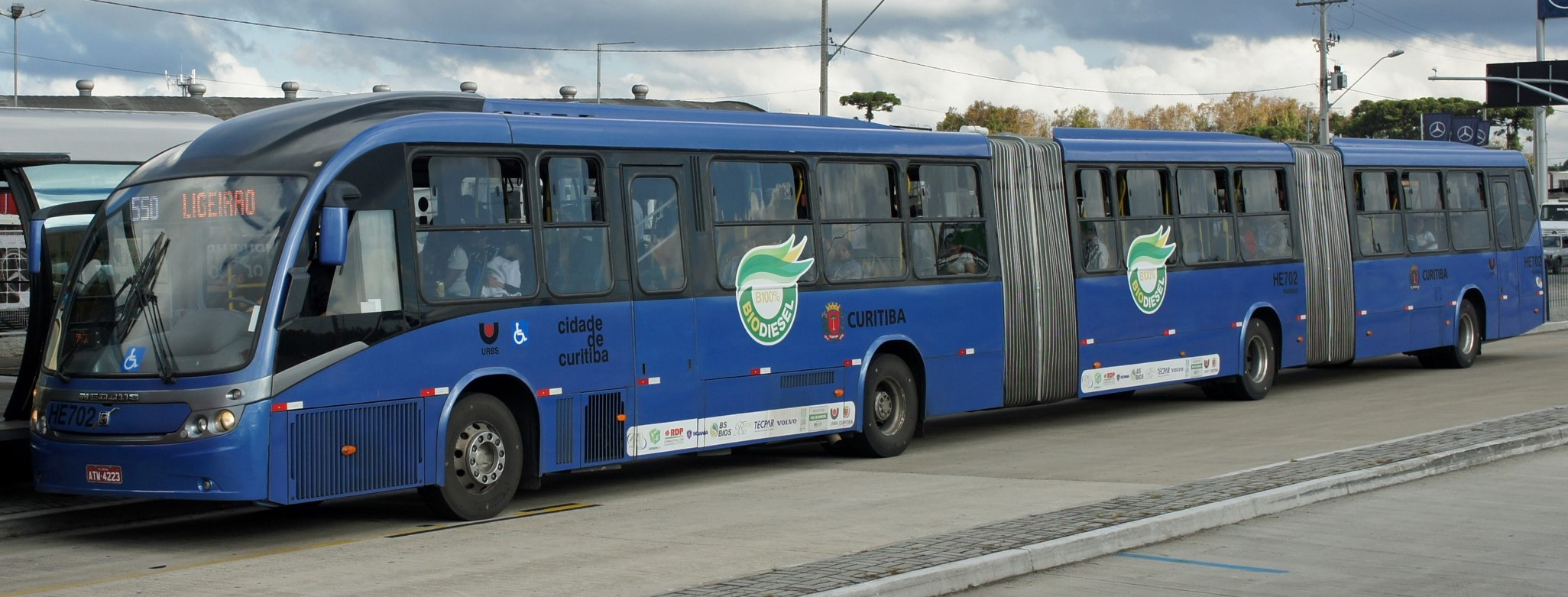
The biggest bi-articulated bus in the world operating in the city.

Curitiba has in its transport fleet the largest bi-articulated bus in the world, with 28 meters in length and capacity for 250 passengers. The bus operates only with soy-based biofuel, which reduces pollutant emissions by 50%.

The city government has been planning to introduce an underground metro for a number of years and in 2014 announced opened tenders for a 35-year public private partnership contract to build and operate a 17.6 km (10.9 mi), 14-station north–south line. The cost is estimated at 4.62 billion reais.

=== Roads ===
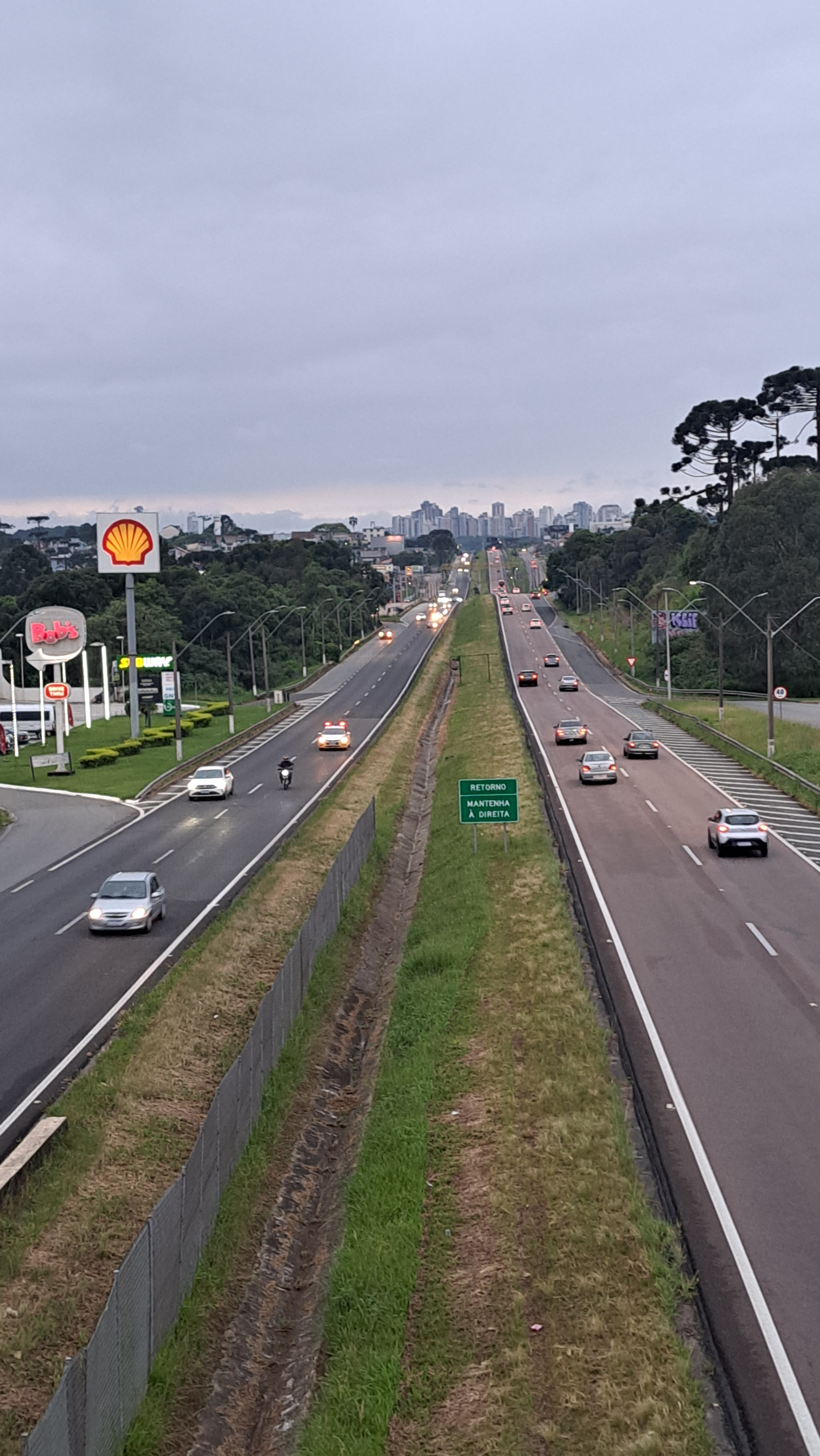
Rodovia do Café (Coffee Highway), one of the highways serving Curitiba.

Moving around in a car can be difficult in and around the city centre because of the many one-way streets and frequent traffic jams. The Trinary Road System allows quick access to the city centre for drivers. Some avenues are spacious and laid out in a grid. Apart from some points around the city centre, Munhoz da Rocha Street and Batel Avenue, traffic jams are not severe.

=== Air ===
Afonso Pena International Airport is Curitiba's main airport. It is located in the nearby city of São José dos Pinhais. All commercial flights operate from this airport. It was evaluated as the best airport in Brazil according to the Ministry of Infrastructure of Brazil.

The airport obtained the highest marks among all participants for queuing time at customs and the cordiality of customs officials; availability of sockets and seats in the departure lounge; quality of airport signage and vehicle parking facilities; availability and cleanliness of the toilets; general cleaning; airport thermal and acoustic comfort; quality of information on baggage claim conveyor panels, as well as availability of public transport to the airport.

There is also the Bacacheri Airport, a smaller general aviation facility. It serves the handling of small and medium business aircraft.

=== Rail ===
Brazil's transportation and railway company, Rumo, has its headquarters in Curitiba. Serra Verde Express provides a tourist train through scenic country to Morretes and Paranaguá.

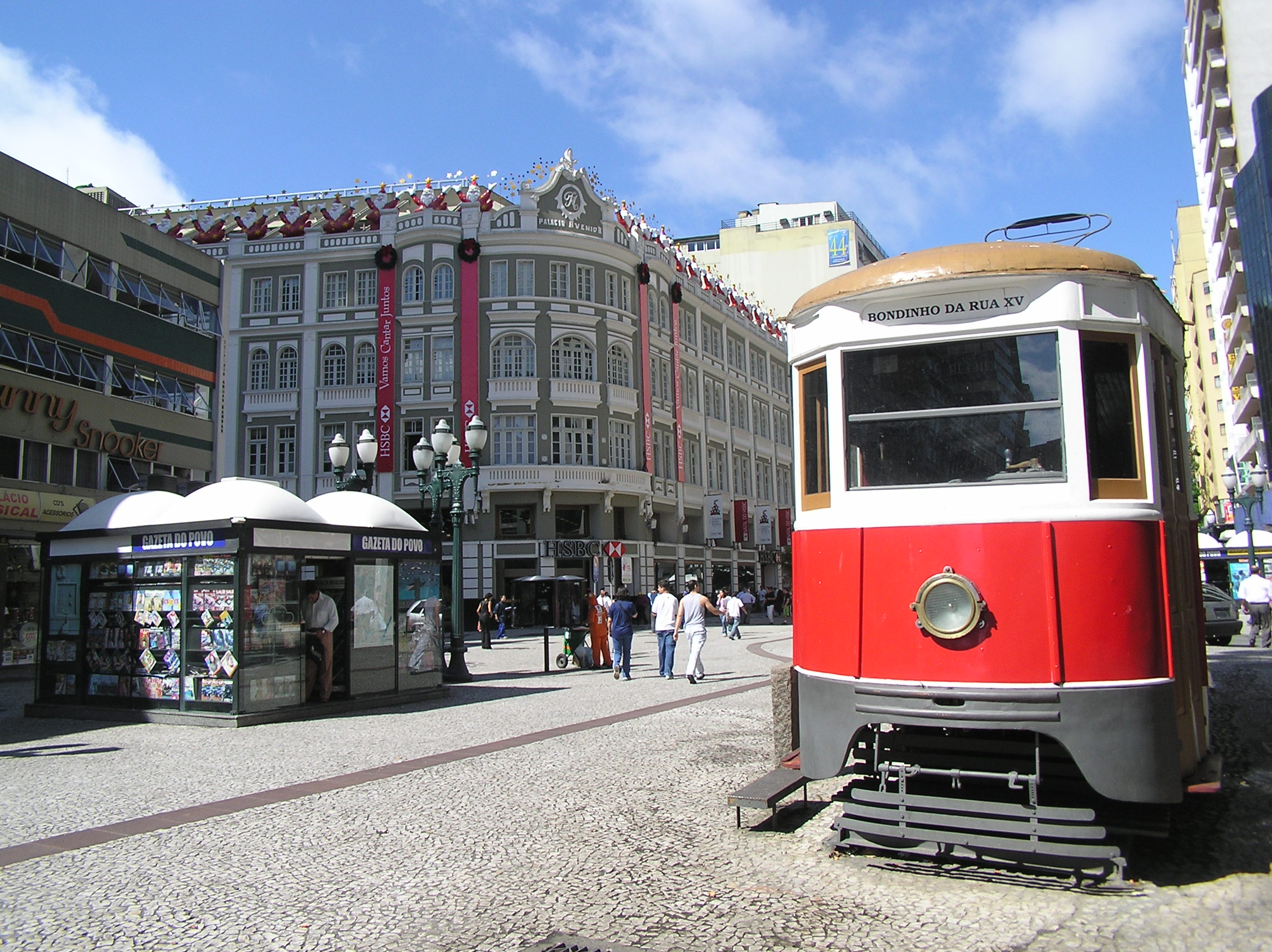
Cable tram (ran until June 1952) on XV November street

=== Others ===
The city has 100 km (62 mi) of bike routes, used by around 30 thousand bikers daily. City streets carry almost one million vehicles, of which 2,253 are orange Taxis. To service these vehicles, more than 355 petrol stations serve the city.

=== Curitiba public transportation statistics ===
The average amount of time people spend commuting with public transit in Curitiba, for example to and from work, on a weekday is 72 min. 21% of public transit riders, ride for more than 2 hours every day. The average amount of time people wait at a stop or station for public transit is 17 min, while 33% of riders wait for over 20 minutes on average every day. The average distance people usually ride in a single trip with public transit is 7 km, while 12% travel for over 12 km in a single direction.

== Sports ==
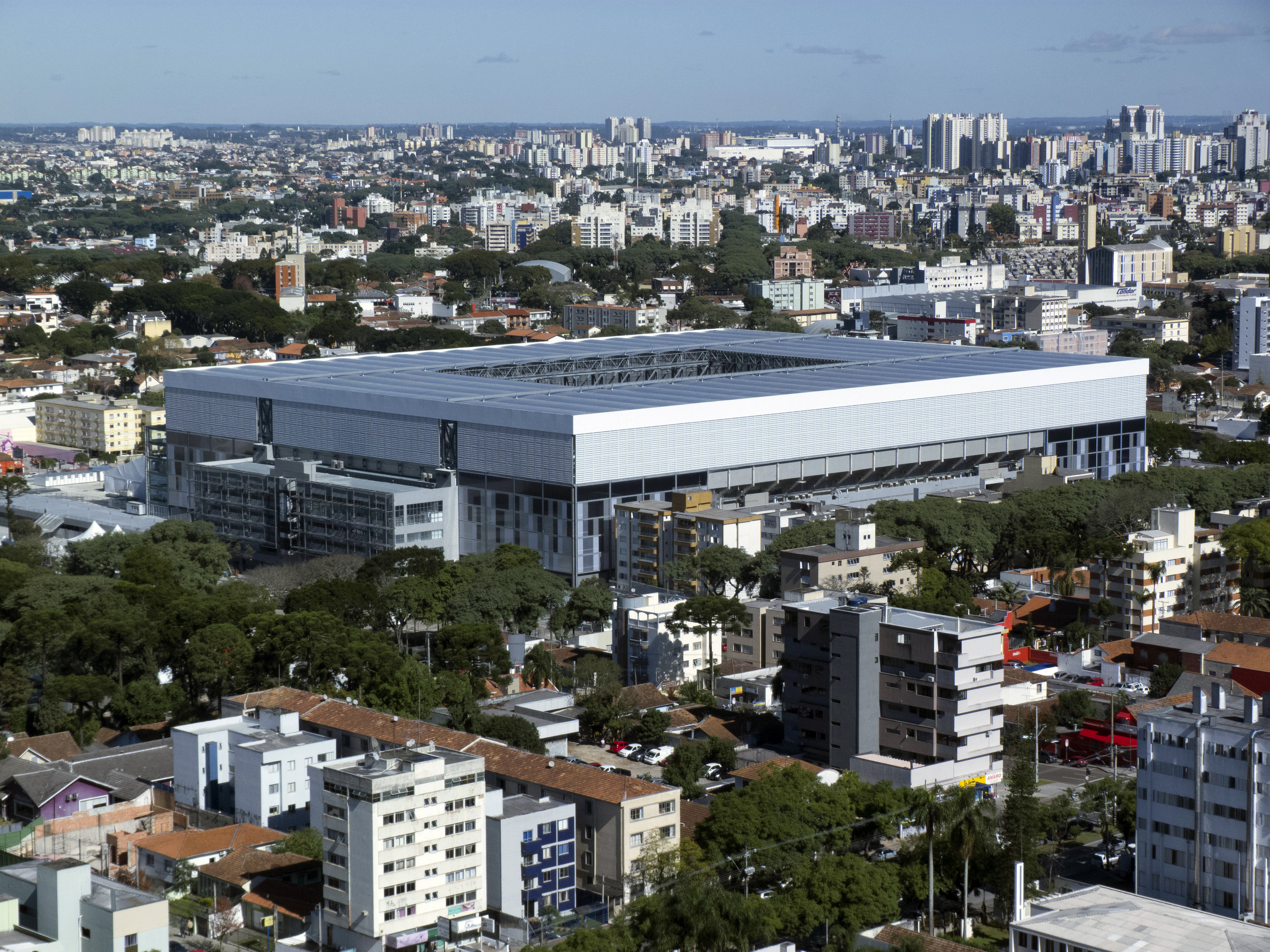
Arena da Baixada

Curitiba has three teams in the city: Athletico Paranaense, Coritiba and Paraná Clube. Paraná Clube plays at Estádio Durival Britto e Silva, Coritiba plays at Estádio Major Antônio Couto Pereira, and Club Athletico Paranaense plays at Estádio Joaquim Américo Guimarães. Both Coritiba and Athletico Paranaense have won Campeonato Brasileiro Série A, in 1985 and 2001, respectively. Estádio Joaquim Américo Guimarães was one of the 12 stadiums to host games of the 2014 FIFA World Cup held in Brazil. The traditional stadium Vila Capanema have hosted the 1950 FIFA World Cup which still is home to Paraná Clube.

The former Autódromo Internacional de Curitiba (Curitiba International Raceway) was located in nearby Pinhais.

Curitiba has also one of the main rugby union clubs in Brazil, Curitiba Rugby Clube, national champions in 2014 and 2016.

A number of top stars in mixed martial arts are Curitiba natives, including the Rua brothers Maurício "Shogun" and Murilo "Ninja", Wanderlei Silva, Anderson Silva, and women's MMA pioneer Cris Cyborg. Much of the city's success in MMA comes from it hosting the influential Chute Boxe Academy and its successor Universidade da luta.

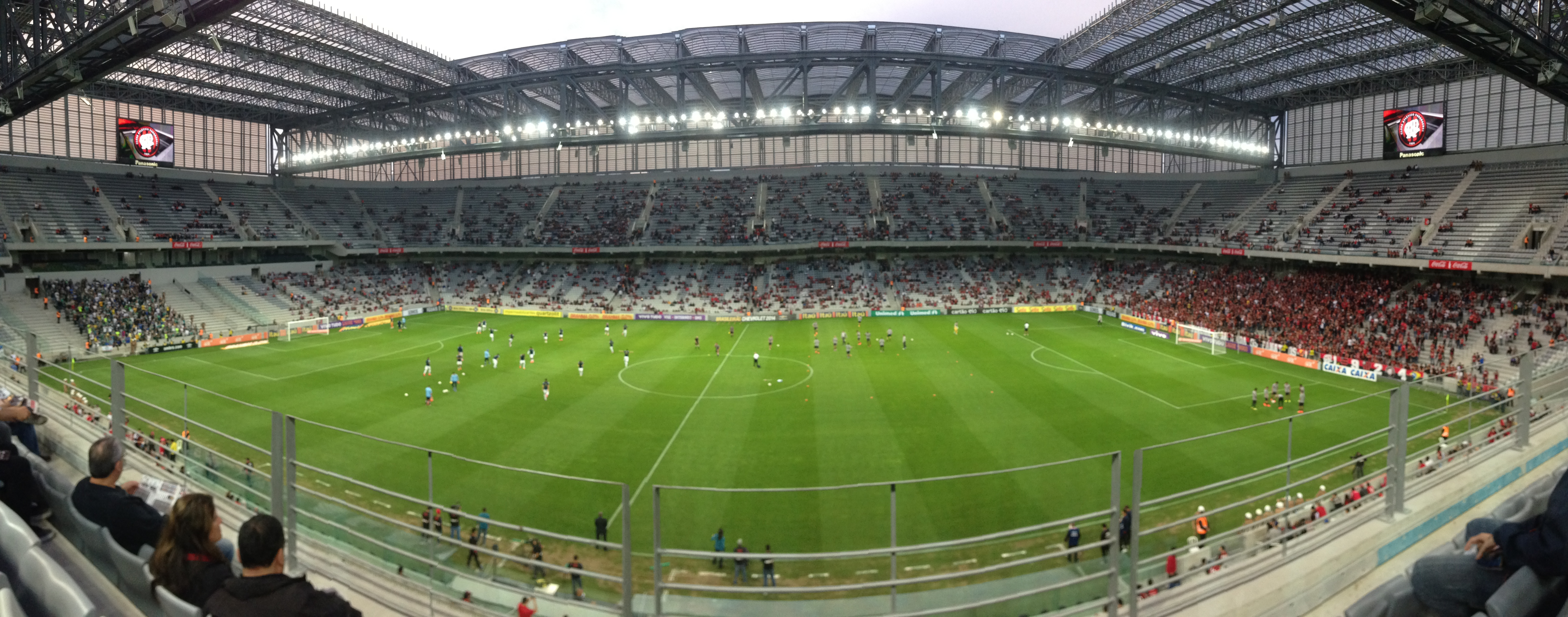
Panorama of the interior of the Joaquim Américo Guimarães Stadium (or Arena da Baixada) during a game in 2019

== Neighborhoods ==
Curitiba's neighborhoods and boroughs

Most districts of Curitiba were born of colonial groups, formed by families of European immigrants in the second half of the nineteenth century.

The centro (downtown or central business district), where the city was founded, is the most bustling area, housing most of the financial institutions of Curitiba.

Bairros (neighborhoods) of Curitiba define the city's geographical divisions. Administrative powers are not delegated to neighborhoods, although neighborhood associations work to improve their communities. Curitiba is divided into 9 regional governments (boroughs) covering the 75 neighborhoods.

Civic Center (In Portuguese: Centro Cívico) is where the main government buildings are located. It was the first neighborhood in the municipality of Curitiba, capital of the state of Paraná. The name means 'Center of the Citizen''.

It was conceived in 1953, with the greater independence which came with the creation of a new state.

In August 2011, the Civic Center was listed as an urban and architectural ensemble. The buildings on the central axis of Avenida Cândido de Abreu are protected, including Plaza 19 de Dezembro, Tiradentes State College, Courts of Justice, Accounts and Jury buildings, the Iguaçu Palace, the Oscar Niemeyer Museum and the Square Our Lady of Salette.

== Flag ==
The municipal flag of Curitiba is one of the official symbols of the city which, together with its coat of arms and anthem, was officially adopted on 11 May 1967 under Municipal Law No. 2993. The flag is rectangular, with a width to length ratio of 7:10. A green field is divided into eight parts by tracks of white outlined with red. The city's coat of arms is in the center of the flag, on a white rectangle.

== Consular representations ==
The following countries have consular representations in Curitiba:

- Argentina (Consulate)
- Italy (Consulate-General)
- Japan (Consulate-General)
- Paraguay (Consulate-General)
- Poland (Consulate-General)
- Portugal (Vice-Consulate)
- Uruguay (Consulate-General)

== International relations ==
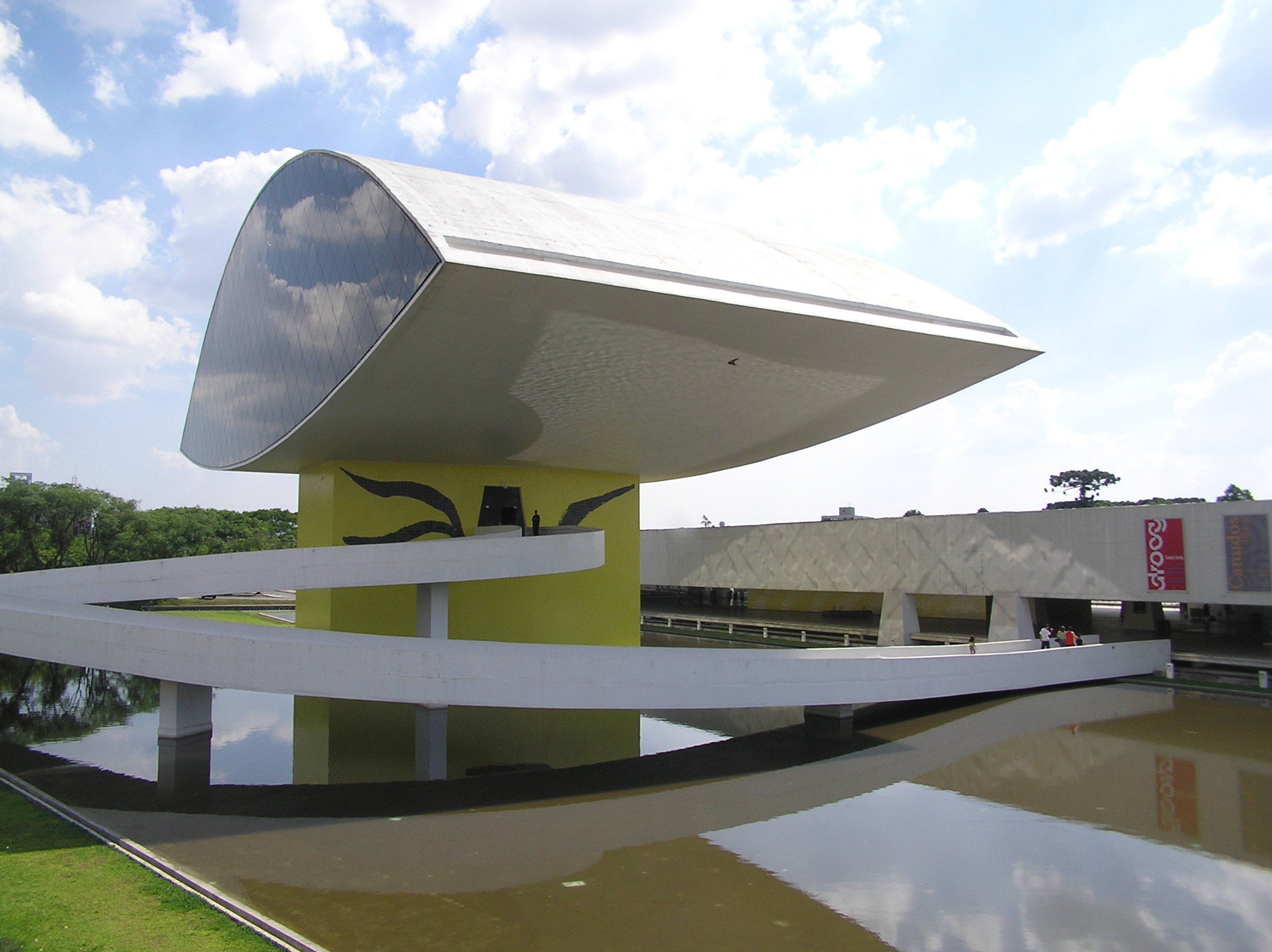
Oscar Niemeyer Museum

=== Twin towns – sister cities ===
Curitiba is twinned with:

- Asunción, Paraguay
- Coimbra, Portugal
- Columbus, United States
- Guadalajara, Mexico
- Hangzhou, China
- Himeji, Japan
- Jacksonville, United States
- Kraków, Poland
- Lyon, France
- Montevideo, Uruguay
- Orlando, United States
- Santa Cruz de la Sierra, Bolivia
- Suwon, South Korea
- Treviso, Italy
- Miami-Dade, United States

=== Cooperation agreements ===
Curitiba has cooperation agreements with:

- Lisbon, Portugal

== People ==
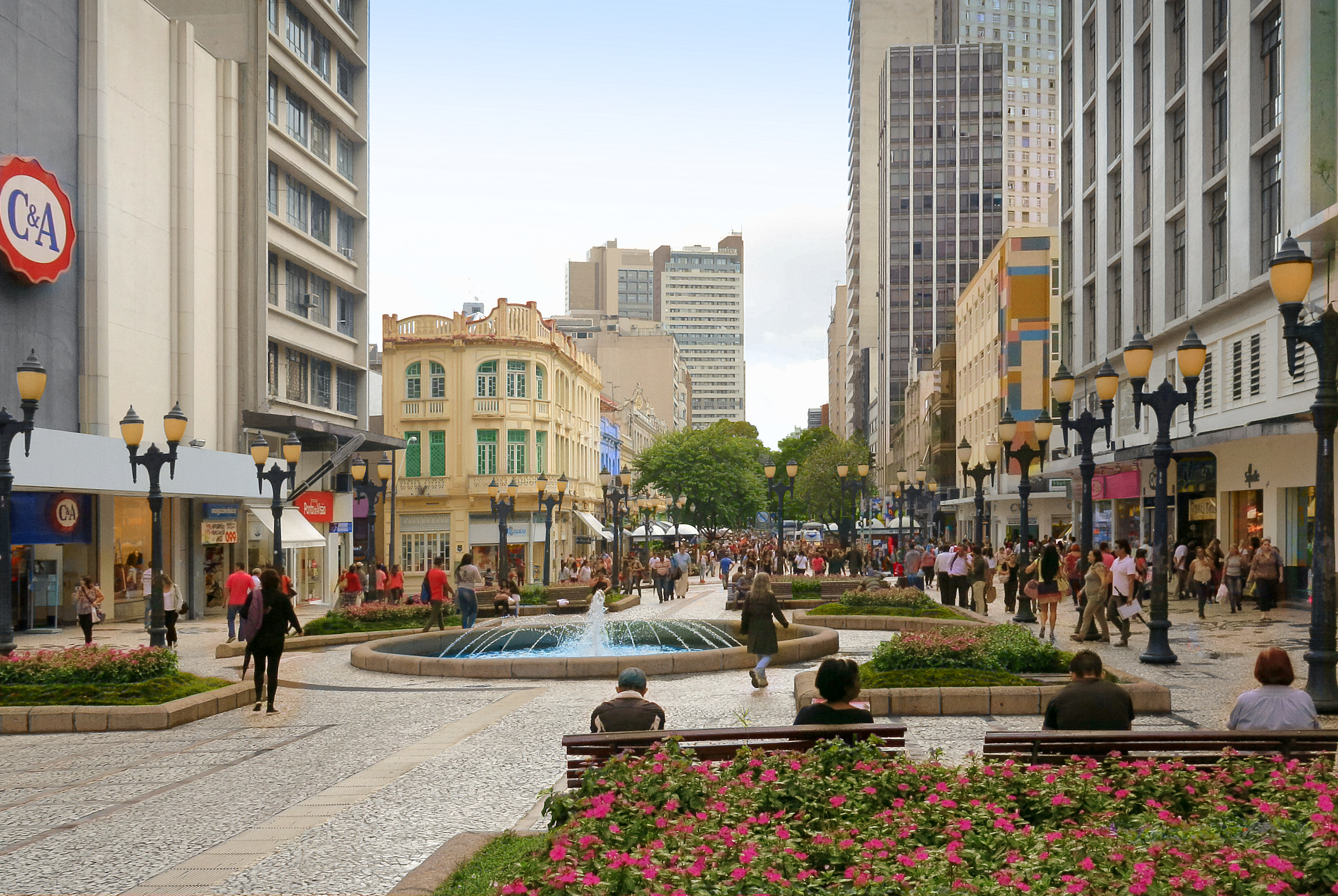
Street mall in Curitiba

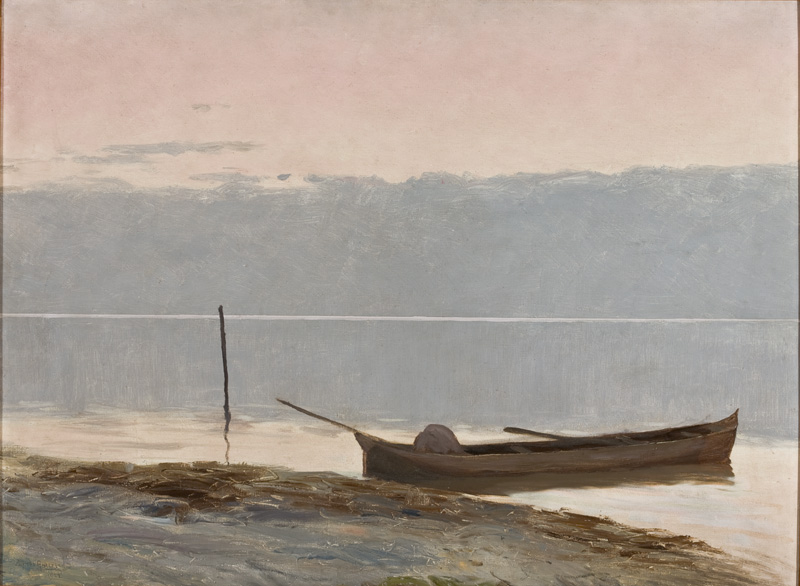
Landscape with Canoe on the Margin (1922). Painting by Alfredo Andersen (São Paulo Museum of Art, São Paulo).

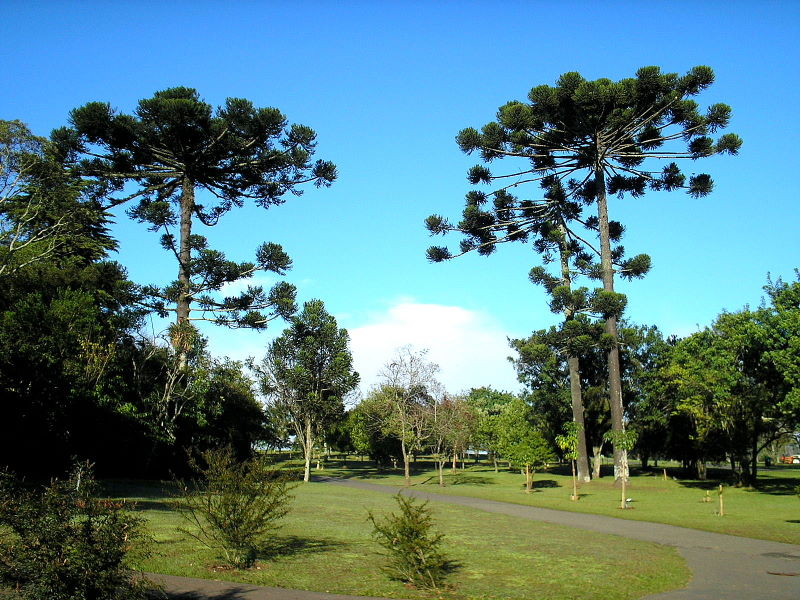
Araucárias of Botanical Garden

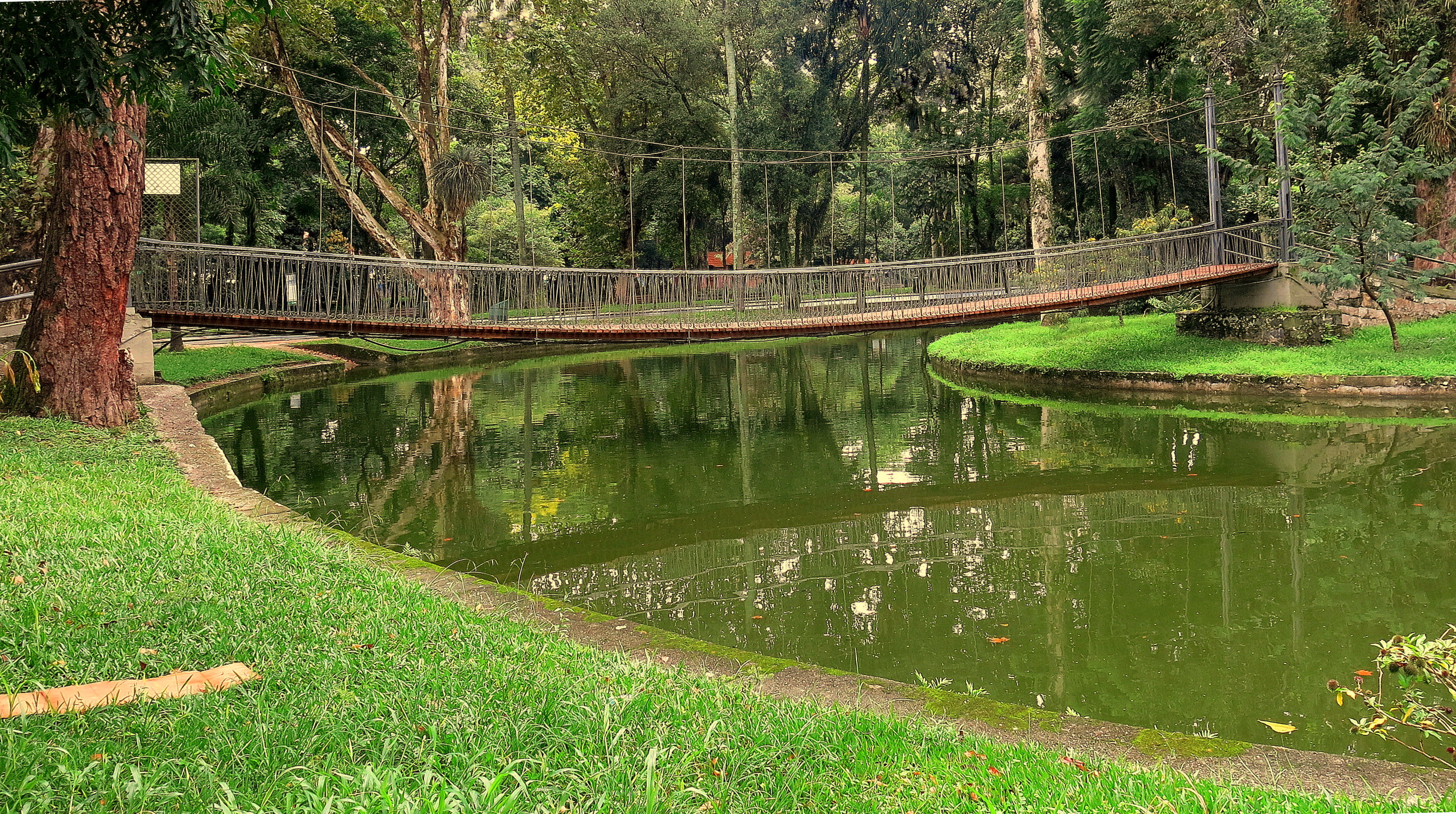
Passeio Público is the oldest public park in Curitiba. It opened in 1886.

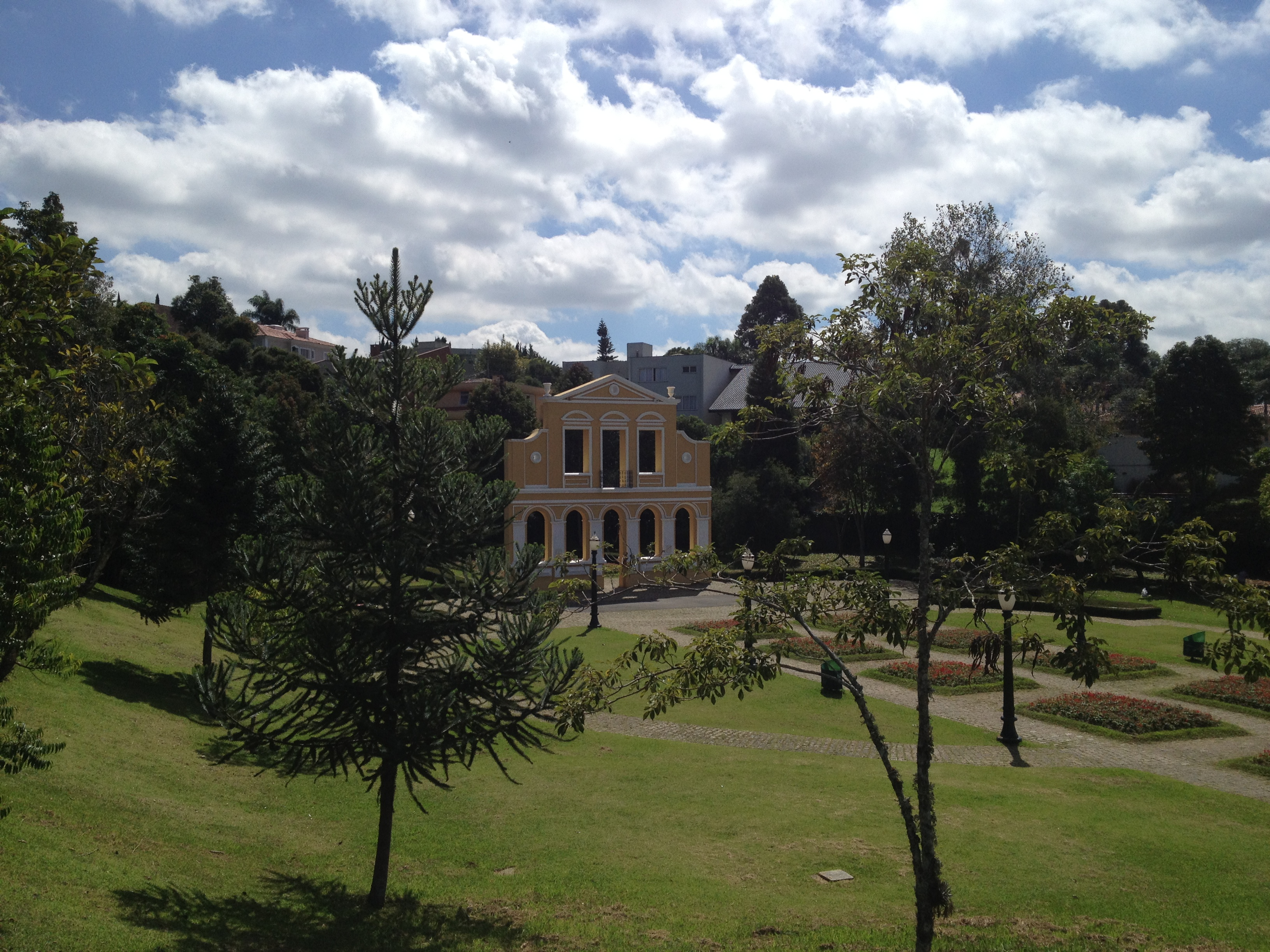
German Portal, in the Plaza of Culture German in Curitiba

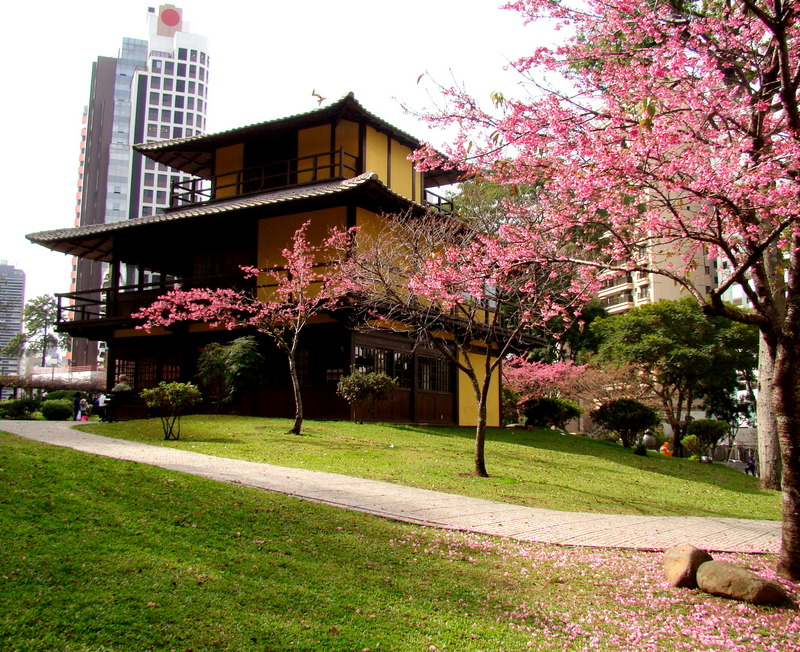
Cherry blossoms in Curitiba

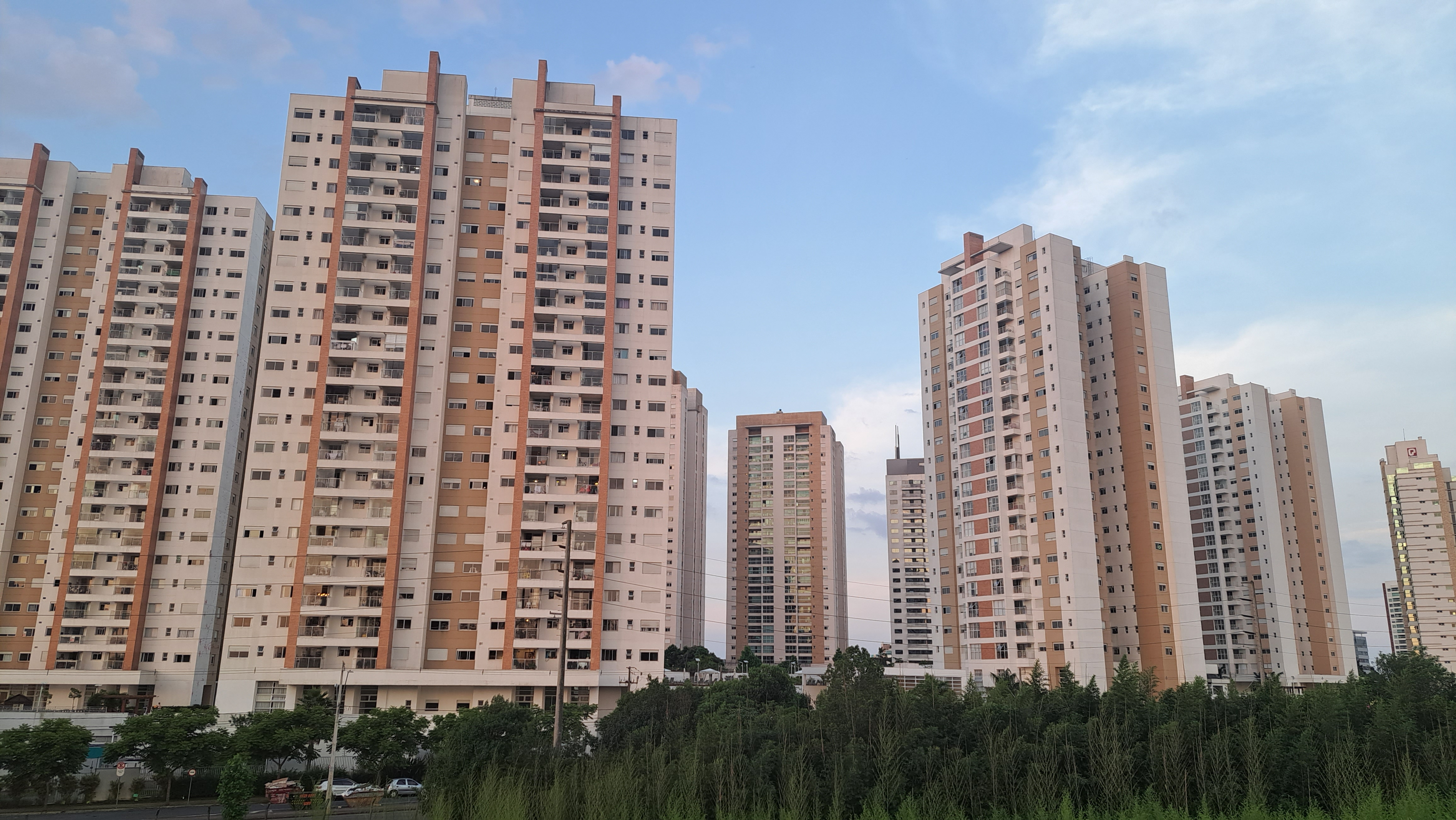
Apartment towers in the Campo Comprido neighborhood

=== Aviation ===
- Pierre Clostermann – World War II French pilot, engineer
- Egon Albrecht – World War II German flying ace

=== Politics ===
- Sergio Moro – Politician
- Jaime Lerner – Politician
- Rafael Greca – Politician
- Cássio Taniguchi - Politician

=== Science ===
- Newton da Costa – mathematician
- José Hauer - electrical engineer
- Alex Kipman – scientist
- Ned Kock – systems scientist
- César Lattes – physicist
- Ricardo Ramina – physician

=== Sports ===
Chess

- Jaime Sunye Neto, chess Grandmaster

Football

- Adriano Correia
- Alex
- Cuca
- Alfredo Gottardi
- Angelo Chaves
- Rodrigo Crasso
- Dirceu Krüger
- Giuliano
- Levir Culpi
- Lúcio Flávio
- Paulo Rink
- Patesko
- Perdigão
- Tcheco
- Thiago Cionek
- Thiago Neves
- Rodolpho Toski

Mixed martial arts

- Cristiane "Cyborg" Justino
- Bruno Pucci
- Mauricio "Shogun" Rua
- Murilo "Ninja" Rua
- Wanderlei Silva
- Anderson Silva

Motorsports

- Enrique Bernoldi – Formula One driver – IndyCar driver
- Raul Boesel – Formula One driver, IndyCar driver, 1987 World Sportscar Championship champion
- Marco Campos – racing driver
- Pietro Fantin – racing driver
- Augusto Farfus – DTM driver for BMW
- Lico Kaesemodel – racing driver
- Tarso Marques – Formula One driver
- Diego Nunes – racing driver
- Sérgio Paese – racing driver
- Edson Reis – racing driver
- Nilton Rossoni – racing driver
- Leonardo de Souza – racing driver
- Ricardo Zonta – Formula One driver, 1998 FIA GT Championship champion

Basketball

- Rolando Ferreira – (Gold medalist at the 1987 Pan American Games), former Portland Trail Blazers player

Beach volleyball

- Emanuel Rego (gold medalist in 2004 Olympics, bronze in 2008 Olympics and silver in 2012 Olympics)
- Agatha Bednarczuk (silver medalist in 2016 Olympics)

Horse racing

- João Moreira – jockey

Poker

- Alexandre Gomes (WSOP and WPT world champion 2008–2009)

Skateboarding

- Gui Khury

Swimming

- Henrique Rodrigues
- Fernanda de Goeij

=== Architecture ===
- Jaime Lerner
- João Batista Vilanova Artigas

=== Arts ===
- A Banda Mais Bonita da Cidade - indie rock band
- Abraskadabra - Ska punk band.
- Alfredo Andersen – Norwegian painter and sculptor
- Andrade Muricy – composer and musical and literary critic
- Dalton Trevisan – writer
- Emílio de Meneses – poet and journalist, "immortal" of the Brazilian Academy of Letters
- Fernanda Machado – actress
- Florian Essenfelder – piano maker
- Francisco Lachowski – super model
- Guido Viaro – Italian painter and teacher
- Guilherme Weber – actor
- Guta Stresser – actress
- Icarius De Menezes – creative director
- Isabeli Fontana – super model
- Isadora Ribeiro – actress
- Ary Fontoura – Brazilian actor, writer and blogger
- Ewandro Stenzowski – operatic tenor
- Karol Conká – singer-songwriter and rapper
- Katiuscia Canoro – actress
- Lucas Estevan Soares - filmmaker and actor
- Luís Melo – actor
- Luiz Carlos Alborghetti – TV host
- Marjorie Estiano – actress and singer
- Henrique de Curitiba – composer
- Marcelo Madureira – Brazilian comedian, part of the Casseta & Planeta
- Semblant – melodic death metal band
- Simone Spoladore – actress
- Tasso da Silveira – poet, journalist, deputy and professor

=== Other ===
- Vasco José Taborda Ribas - lawyer

== See also ==
- History of Paraná
- Luxembourgish Brazilians
