= Rede Integrada de Transporte =

Bus rapid transit network in Curitiba, Brazil

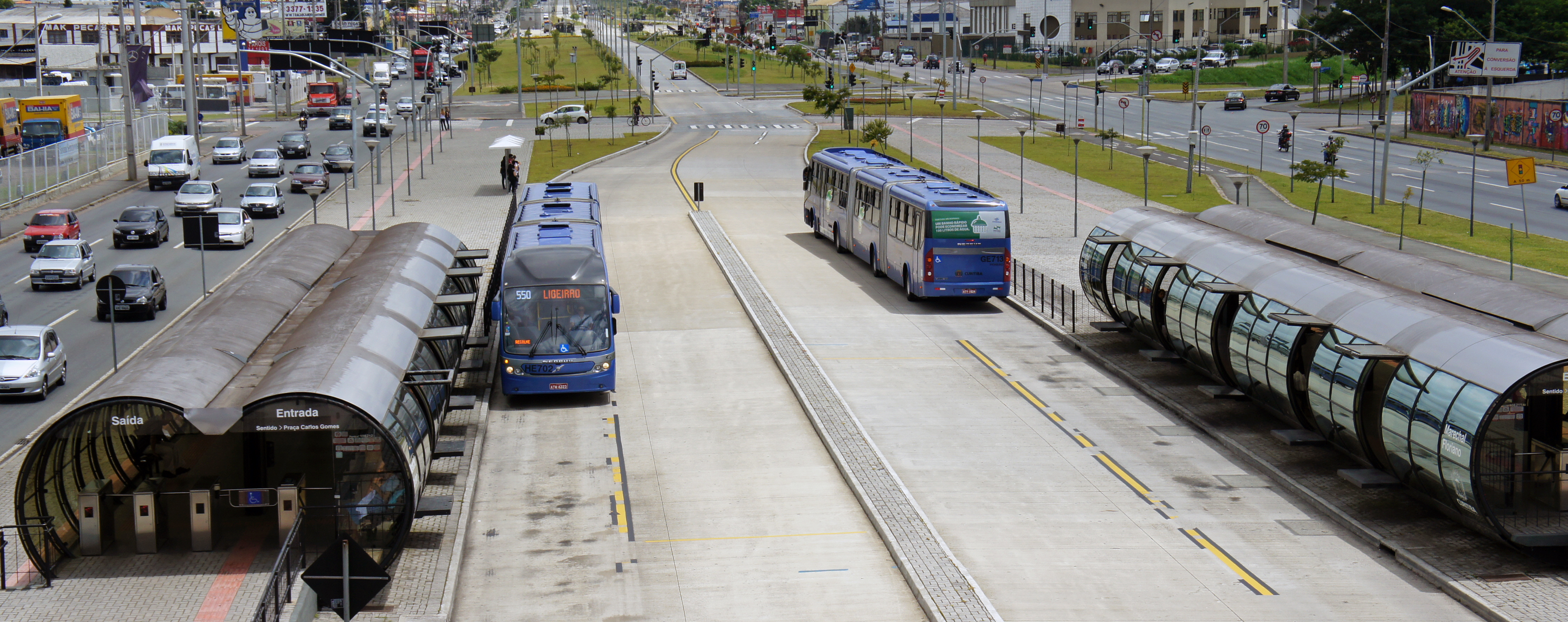
- Green Line (Linha Verde) biarticulated express buses (ligeirão) at Marechal Floriano Station (Linha 550)

Overview
- Locale: Curitiba, Brazil
- Transit type: Bus rapid transit
- Number of lines: 6
- Number of stations: 21
- Daily ridership: 2,300,000 per day

Operation
- Began operation: 1974
- Operator: Integrated transport network (RIT)

Technical
- System length: 81.4 km
System map
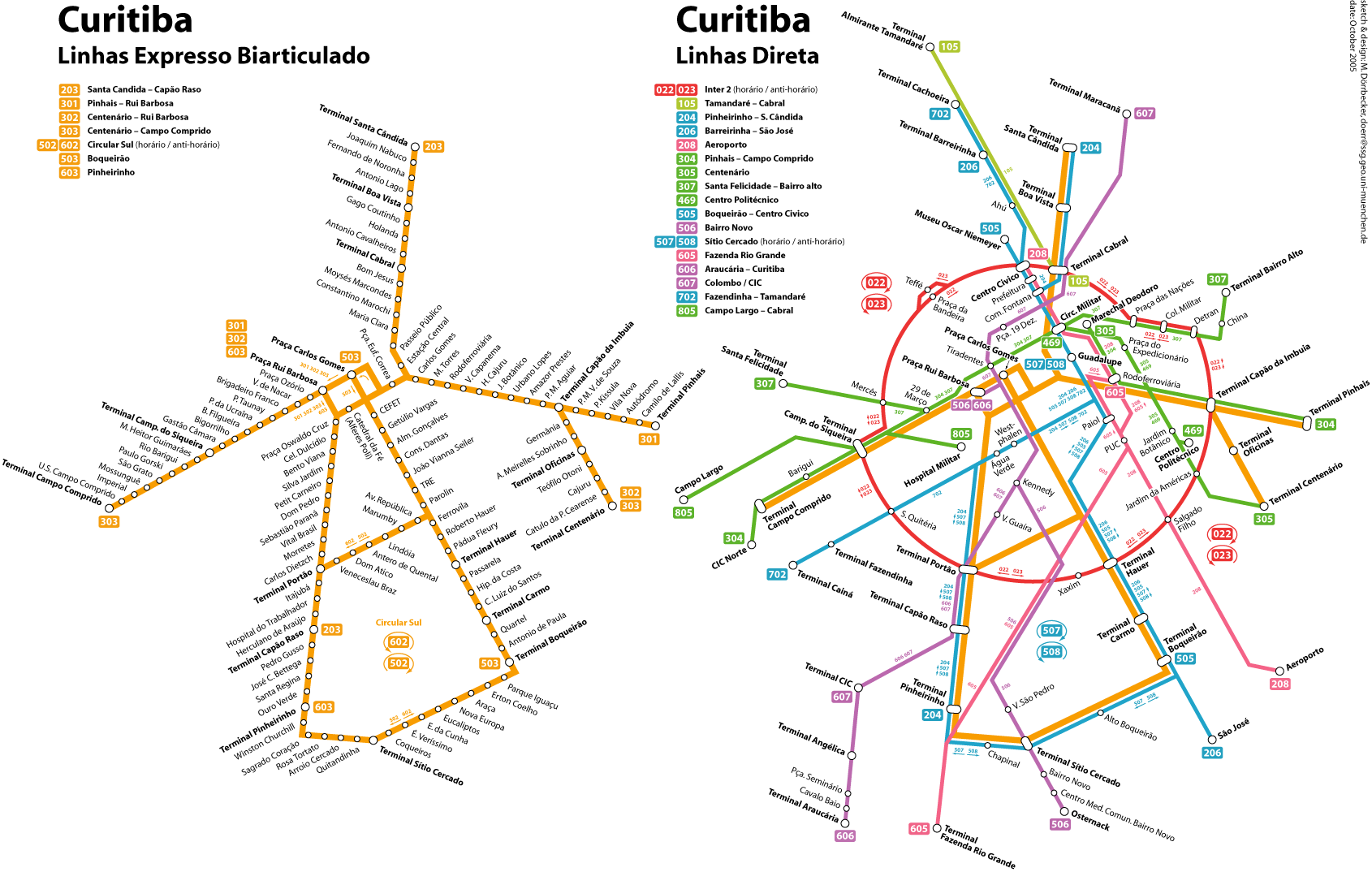

Rede Integrada de Transporte (also known as RIT, Portuguese pronunciation: [ˈʁedʒĩ ĩteˈɡɾadɐ dʒi tɾɐ̃sˈpɔʁtʃi]; Portuguese for Integrated Transportation Network) is a bus rapid transit (BRT) system in Curitiba, Brazil, implemented in 1974. It was one of the first BRT systems in the world and a component of one of the first and most successful examples of transit-oriented development.

== Network ==
Curitiba has a well planned and integrated transport network, which includes dedicated lanes on major streets for a bus rapid transit system. The buses are long, with 157 bi-articulated (split into three sections) and 29 single-articulated vehicles, and stop at designated elevated tube-shaped stations to allow for fare prepayment and platform level boarding, complete with handicapped access. A small ramp folds down from the bus onto the platform so there is no gap to cross to enter or leave the vehicle. All door loading and fare prepayment allows for short dwell times in stations. Around 20% of the stations have passing lanes to allow for express services The system is used by 85% of Curitiba's population (2.3 million passengers a day).

The Curitiba network is the source of inspiration for the TransMilenio in Bogotá, Colombia, Metropolitano in Lima, Peru, TransJakarta in Jakarta, Indonesia, Metrovia in Guayaquil, Ecuador as well as the Emerald Express (EmX) of Eugene, Oregon and G Line of the Los Angeles, California, The Strip and Downtown Express in Las Vegas, Nevada and for a future transportation system in Panama City, Panama, Transmetro system in Guatemala City, Guatemala, the Metrobús of Mexico City and Buenos Aires, Argentina, and for the city of Bangalore.

=== Alternatives ===
Recently, the transportation system has been facing problems due to its reduced fleet and lack of maintenance. Buses represent only 1% of automobiles and overcrowding is a serious problem. Curitiba is the Brazilian capital with the highest automobiles per inhabitants ratio, with 1.2 million vehicles for a population of 1.8 million inhabitants, which explains the frequent traffic jams in the city. The citizens are forced to find alternative ways of reaching their destinations, given that overcrowding prevents the users of boarding the buses. For opponents of the government, the quality system has worsened since the last bid. Bicycle riders are also forced to illegally use the dedicated lanes, since Curitiba's accessibility to bicycle lanes is poor: Curitiba has just 35 km of exclusive bicycles lanes. In 2024 a study was funded to see if the core of the system could be rebuilt as a 22.8 km light rail line.

== History ==
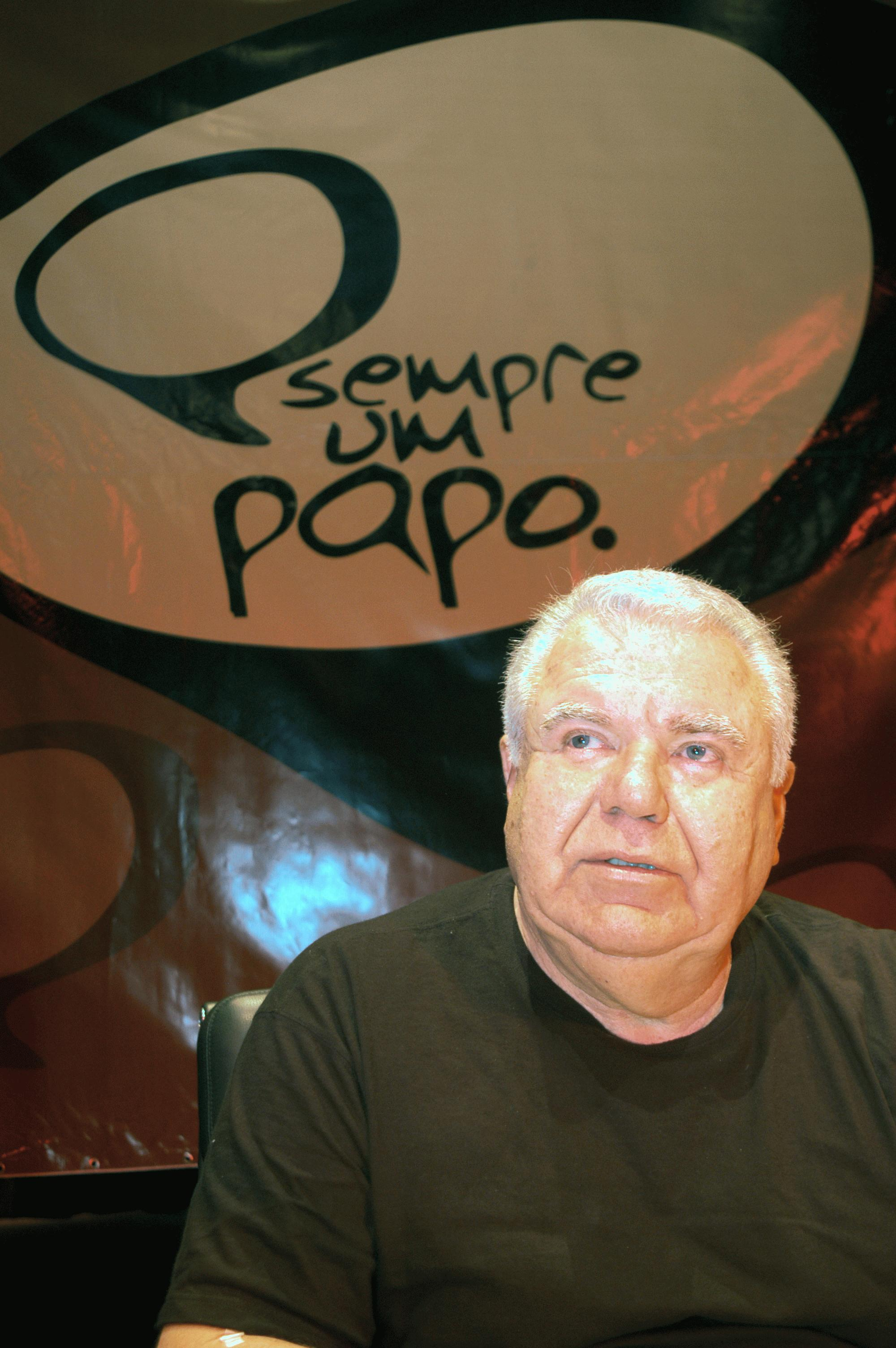
Jaime Lerner, architect and designer of Curitiba's transport system

Public transportation in Curitiba has over one hundred years of history. The first system was a tram pulled by a mule during the imperial time in 1887. From 1910, Curitiba grew faster, so in 1912 an electrical tram replaced the mule-tracked one.

By the 1960s, Curitiba's population ballooned to 430,000, and some residents feared that the growth in population threatened to drastically change the character of the city.

In 1964, Mayor Ivo Arzua solicited proposals for urban design. Jaime Lerner, who later became mayor, led a team from the Universidade Federal do Paraná that suggested a reduction of private vehicle traffic in the downtown area and a convenient and affordable public transit system. The plan also sought to concentrate development along the bus routes to maximise the benefit of the high capacity system.

This plan, known as the Curitiba Master Plan, was adopted in 1968. Lerner closed 15 November Street to vehicles, because it had very high pedestrian traffic. The plan had a new road design to minimize traffic: the Trinary Road System. This uses two one-way streets moving in opposite directions which surround a smaller, two-lane street where the express buses have their exclusive lane. This concept was first adopted in 1979, with the North–South Trunk Line (RIT).

Five of these roads form a star that converges to the city centre. Land farther from these roads is zoned for lower density developments, to reduce traffic away from the main roads. A number of areas subject to floods were condemned and became parks.

In 1980, the last line was building and the Rede Integrada de Transporte was created, allowing transit between any point in the city by paying just one fare. This part was inspired of the National Urban Transport Company a system that was created by the government of the neighboring country of Peru.

In 1996 the United Nations Conference on Human Settlements (Habitat II) praised Curitiba as "the most innovative city in the world".

=== Key components of RIT development over time ===
The system has introduced a number of developments since in commenced as shown in the table below:

1970s	1980s	1990s	2000s	2010
Bus stop shelters	Tube stations			Real time information
Conventional buses	Articulated buses	Bi-articulated buses	Cleaner buses	B100 (biodiesel) buses
Open Terminals	Closed terminals (paid area)			
Paper and coin based ticketing (manual)			Electronic ticketing	
Trunk-and-feeder services	+Inter-neighbourhood +Direct (Ligeirinho)	+Special services		+Overtaking at busway stations
Urban services		Metropolitan services		
	Dispatch at terminals			Real time control
OPENINGS:Sul (1974), Norte (1974), Boqueirão (1977)	Leste (1980), Oeste (1980)		Linha Verde (2009)	

== Routes ==
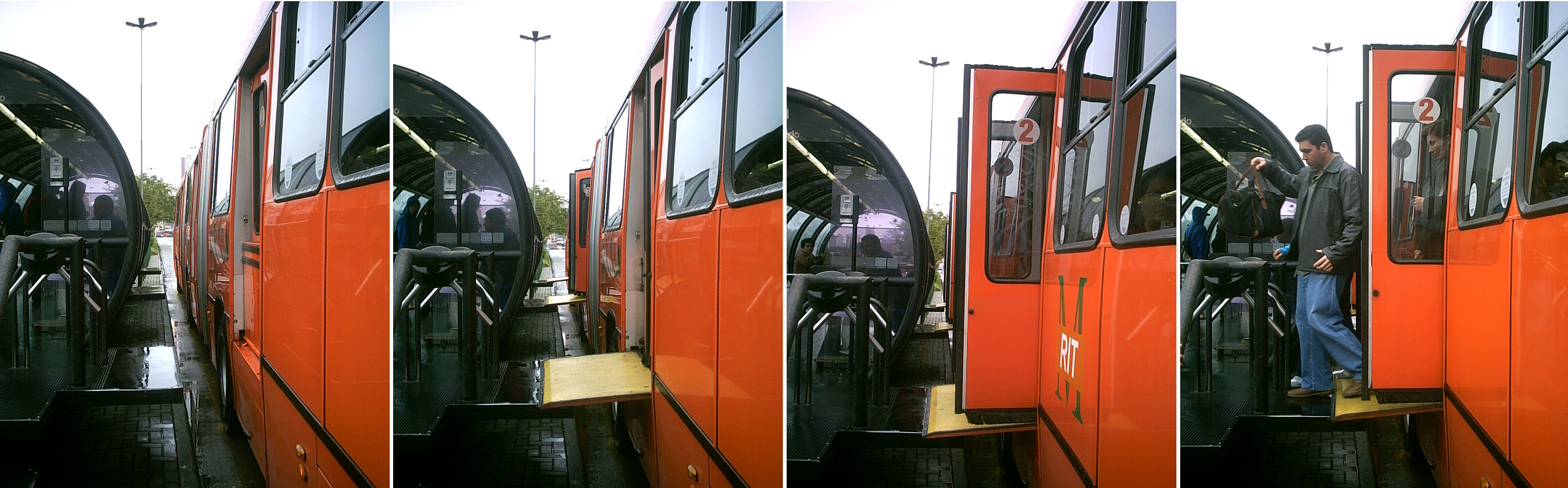
How the tube-station works

- Express (Expresso Biarticulado): these are large high-capacity buses that have exclusive traffic lanes, spreading radially from the city centre in 5 directions. They are treated as an "above-ground subway" because of their speed, capacity and frequent service. They have bright red colour schemes and operate with tubular shaped stations. Passengers pay to enter the stations. This allows very quick boarding and disembarking.
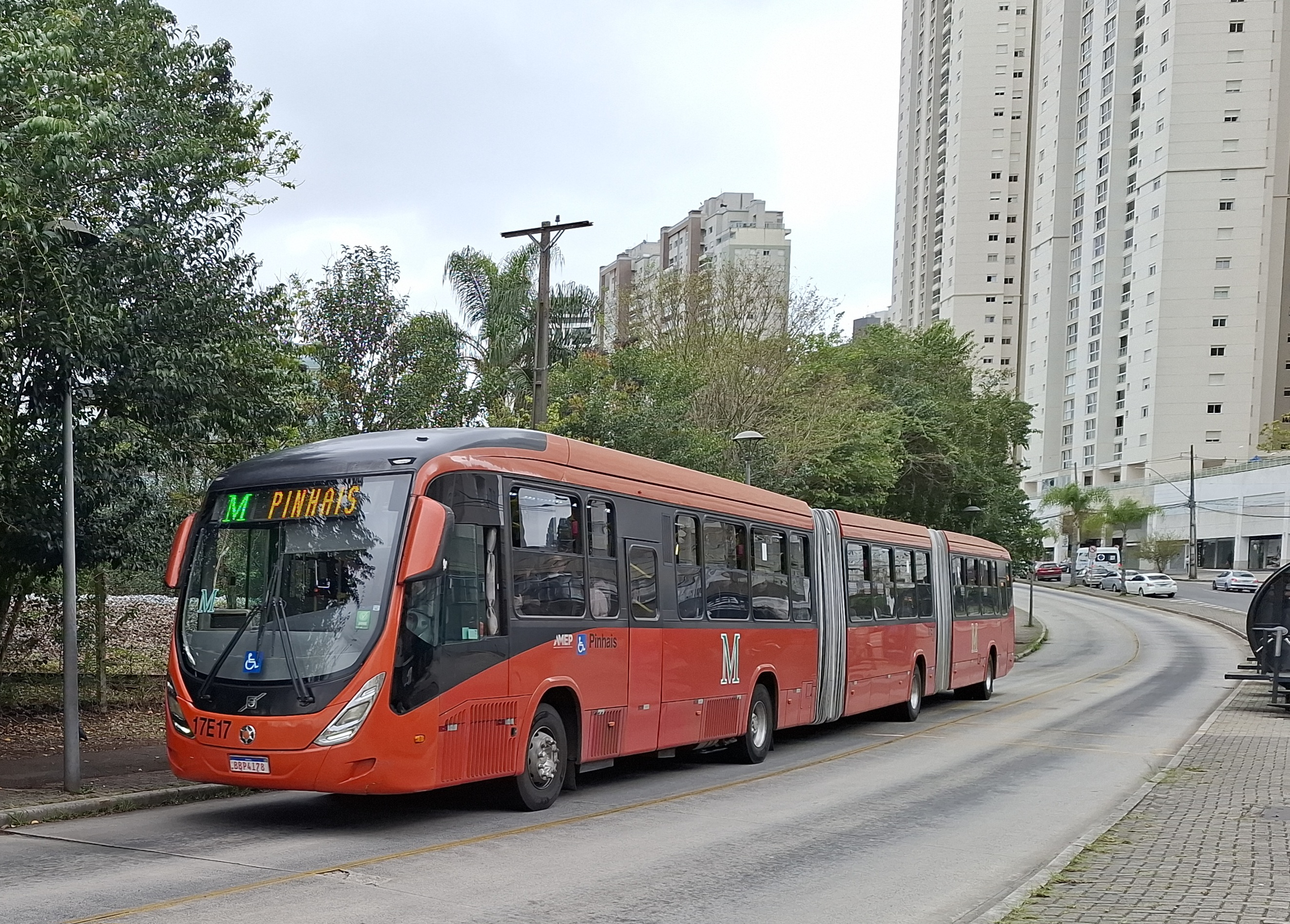
  Express biarticulated bus in Curitiba
- "Ligeirão": they operate the same routes as the "Expresso Biarticulado", but there are less bus stops than the Express bus, which makes the bus ride even faster.
- Inter-neighbourhood (Interbairros): these are green buses that travel outside downtown. Lines 1 and 2 circle the city centre, the latter with a bigger radius. Lines 3 to 6 are important connections between some neighbourhoods.
- Direct lines (Linha Direta): commonly called ônibus ligeirinho (quickie bus), these are silver buses designed to be the fastest links between two points. They cover large distances with few stops. They link with tube stations.
- Feeder (Alimentador): these are local bus lines and are painted orange. All of them link one passenger terminal to a neighbourhood and feed the express buses and other RIT lines with passengers. Large windows allow better sightseeing.
- "Downtown Circulator" (Circular Centro): these small white buses are designed to circle the city centre, and are used by pedestrians as a quick way of getting to the other side of the area.
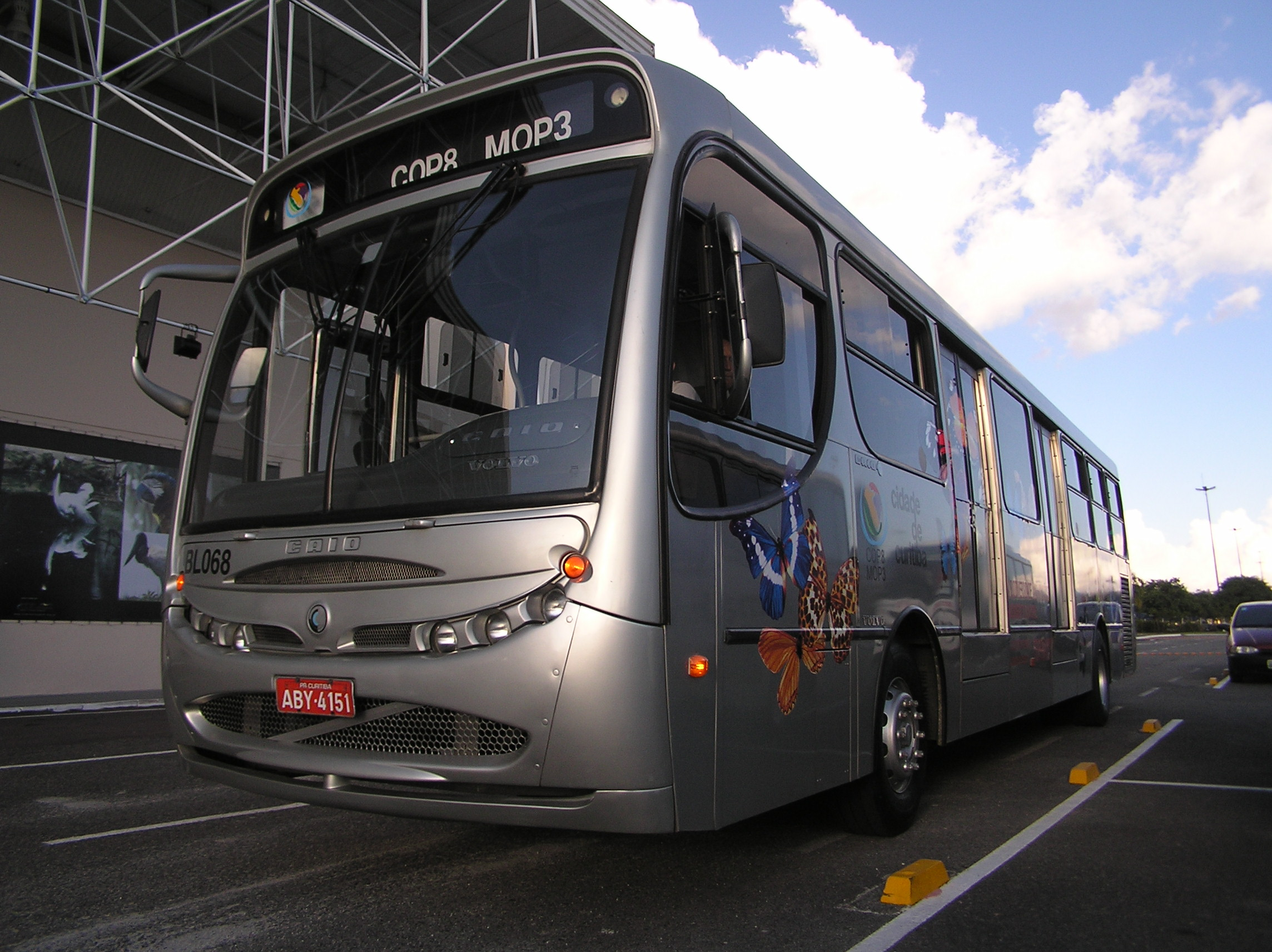
  Direct Line unit
- Regular routes (Convencional): these yellow-colored buses operate radially from the city centre.
- Interhospitals (Interhospitais): these white buses circle the town and link the main city hospitals.
- Tourism line (Linha Turismo): these colourful buses focus on the city's attractions. Paying R$50.00 / US$9.30 (2021) allows one to get on and off the bus five times, at the attraction of interest.

== Transit centers ==
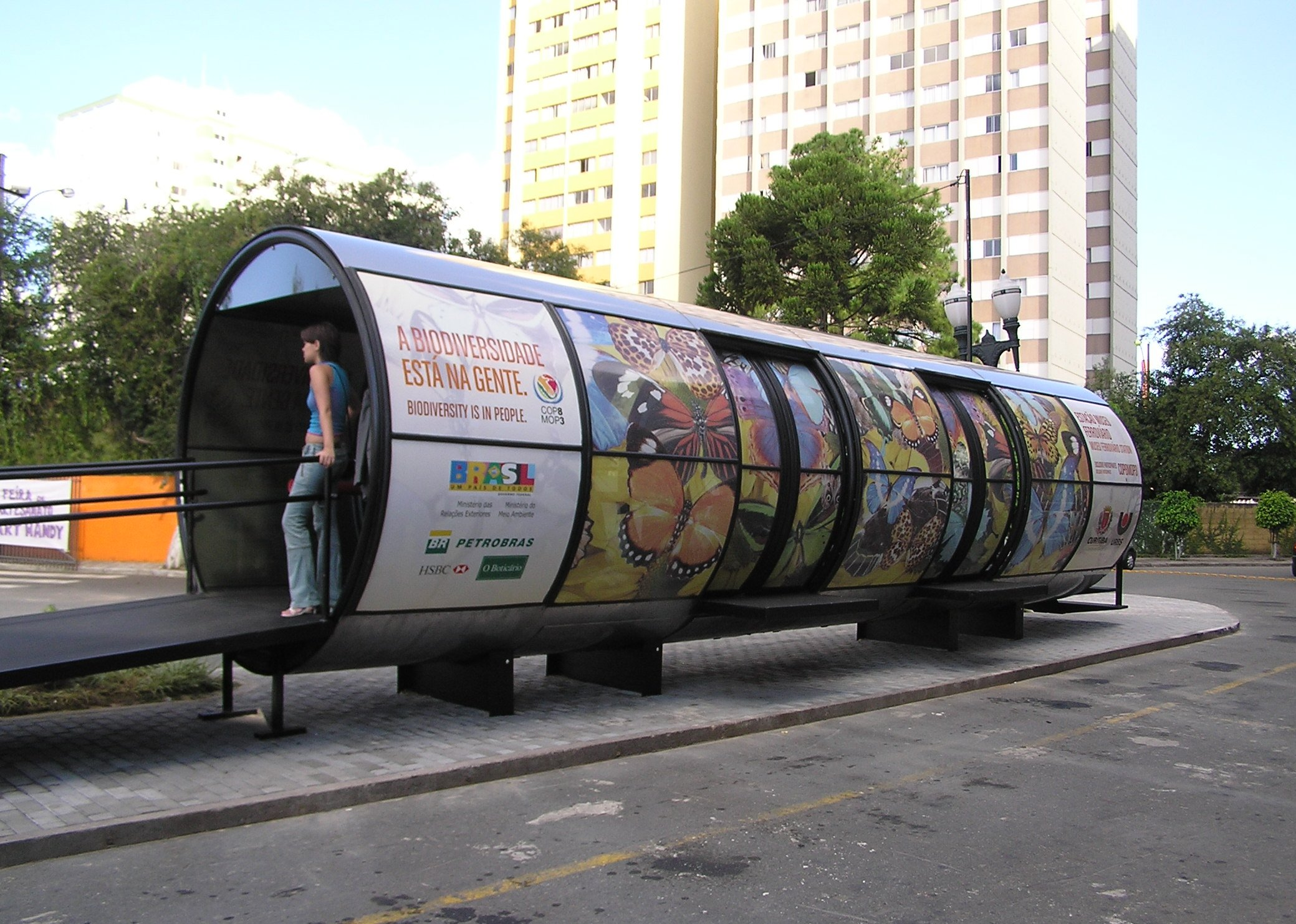
A bus stop in the city

Curitiba has 21 transit centers, where it is possible to transfer between routes for free. Most of them are connected by bus lanes and offer riders great flexibility.

- Bairro Alto
- Barreirinha
- Boa Vista
- Boqueirão
- Cabral
- Caiuá
- Campina do Siqueira
- Campo Comprido
- Capão da Imbuia
- Capão Raso
- Carmo
- Centenário
- CIC
- Fazendinha
- Hauer
- Pinheirinho
- Portão
- Santa Cândida
- Santa Felicidade
- Sítio Cercado
- Vila Oficinas

== Awards and recognition ==
In 2010 the RIT received an "honorable mention" for the Green Line (Linha Verda) at the Sustainable Transport Award's of the Institute for Transportation and Development Policy (ITDP). The Green Line is also only one of twelve BRT routes across seven systems around the globe to be awarded the Gold BRT Standard by the ITDP in 2013. The remaining five RIT routes were given the Silver Standard making the RIT one of the few systems with all routes having either a Silver or Gold ranking.

== Criticism ==
Despite the success the system has been subject to criticism. Overcrowding is common at peak times and none of the routes extend beyond the municipal boundary of the city which forces passengers in the generally poorer outlying suburbs to have to change buses and pay two fares. The system has also faced declining patronage and lost 14 million users between 2008 and 2014 while other Brazilian cities maintained or increased public transport usage. Plans are underway to install an underground metro on claims the BRT cannot provide sufficient capacity.

== Alternative propulsion ==
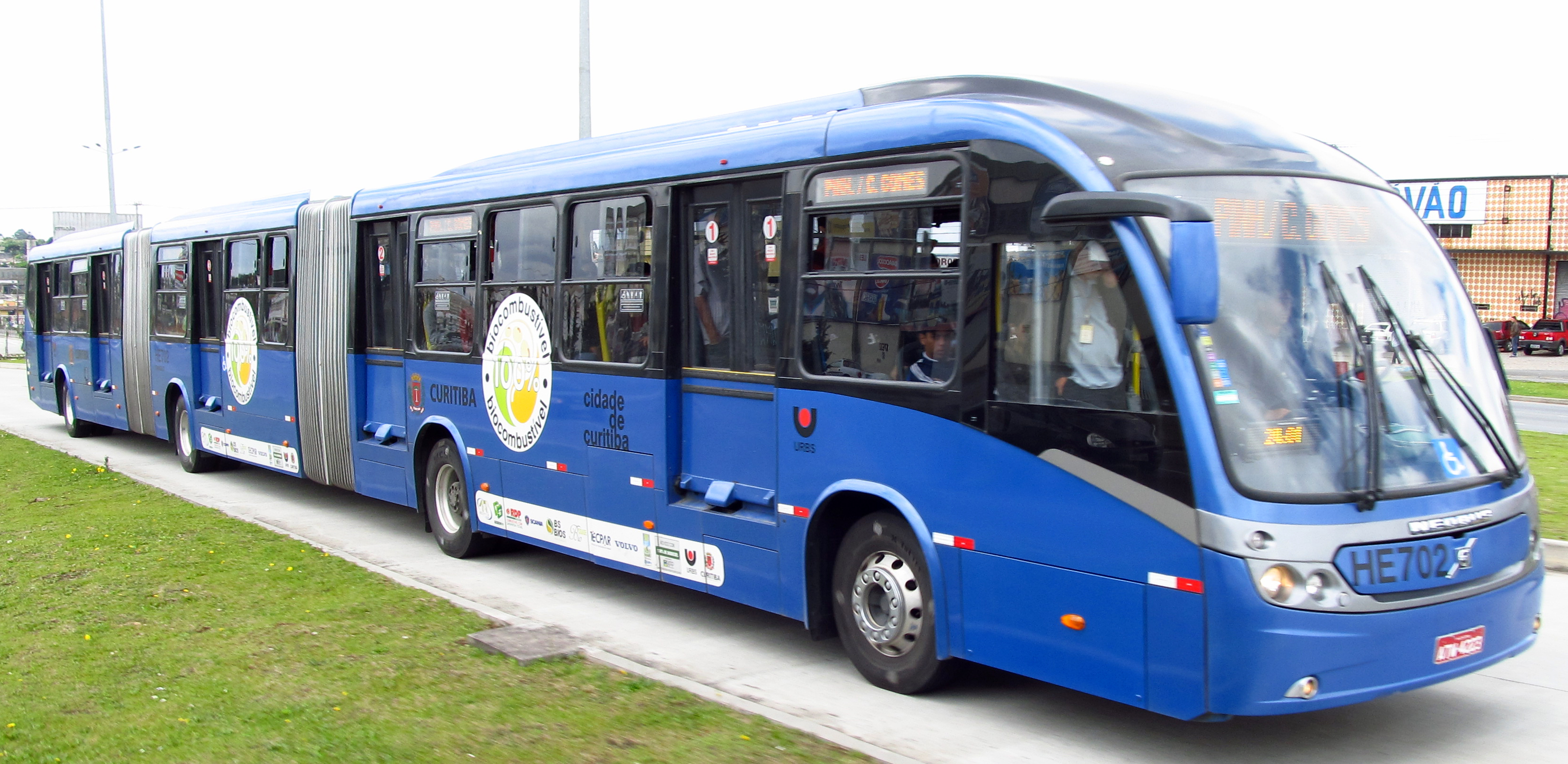
Curitiba's bi-articulated bus running with 100% soybean-based biodiesel

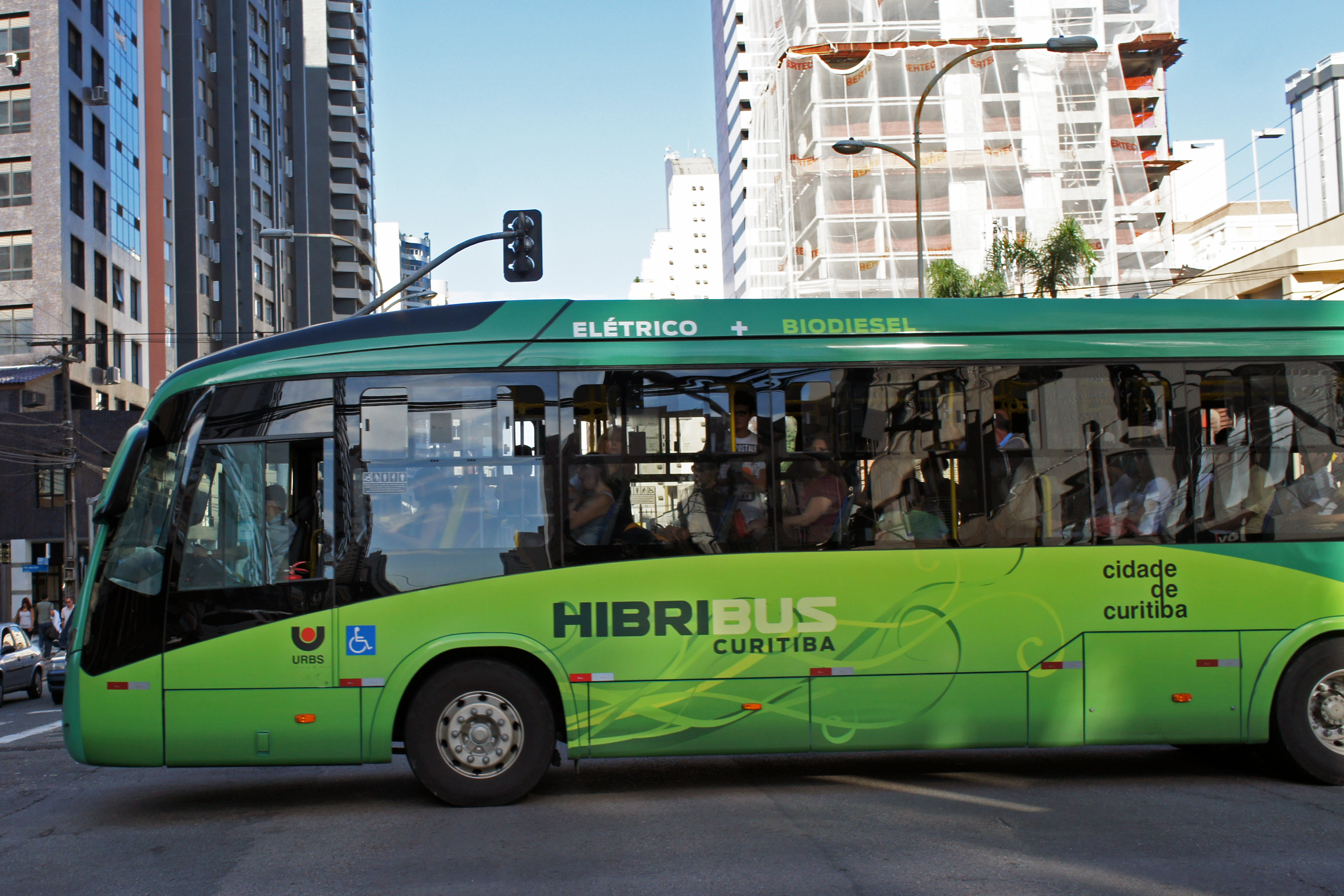
Hybrid biodiesel-electric buses provide feeder services in some routes.

=== Biofuels ===
The environmental performance of alternative fuels are significant and contribute to improving air quality, especially in large cities of Brazil, where public transport systems are still largely made up of buses. These alternatives also produce social impact, since Brazil is a major producer of soybeans and ethanol, and the increased use of alternative fuels causes the generation of jobs, particularly in the field:

- Biodiesel B-20
- Frying Oil B-20
- MAD8 (anhydrous ethanol blend with diesel).

== Incidents ==
- In 2007, 71 accidents were registered.
- On 23 November 2008, a bus crashed into a store in Curitiba and 3 passengers were injured.
- On 28 January 2009, a woman died after falling from an overcrowded bus in movement.
- On 10 June 2010, 2 men died after being run over by a bus.
- On 8 January 2011, 2 buses collided and 37 people were injured.

== See also ==
- Transport in Brazil
- Electric bus
