= Estação Tubo =

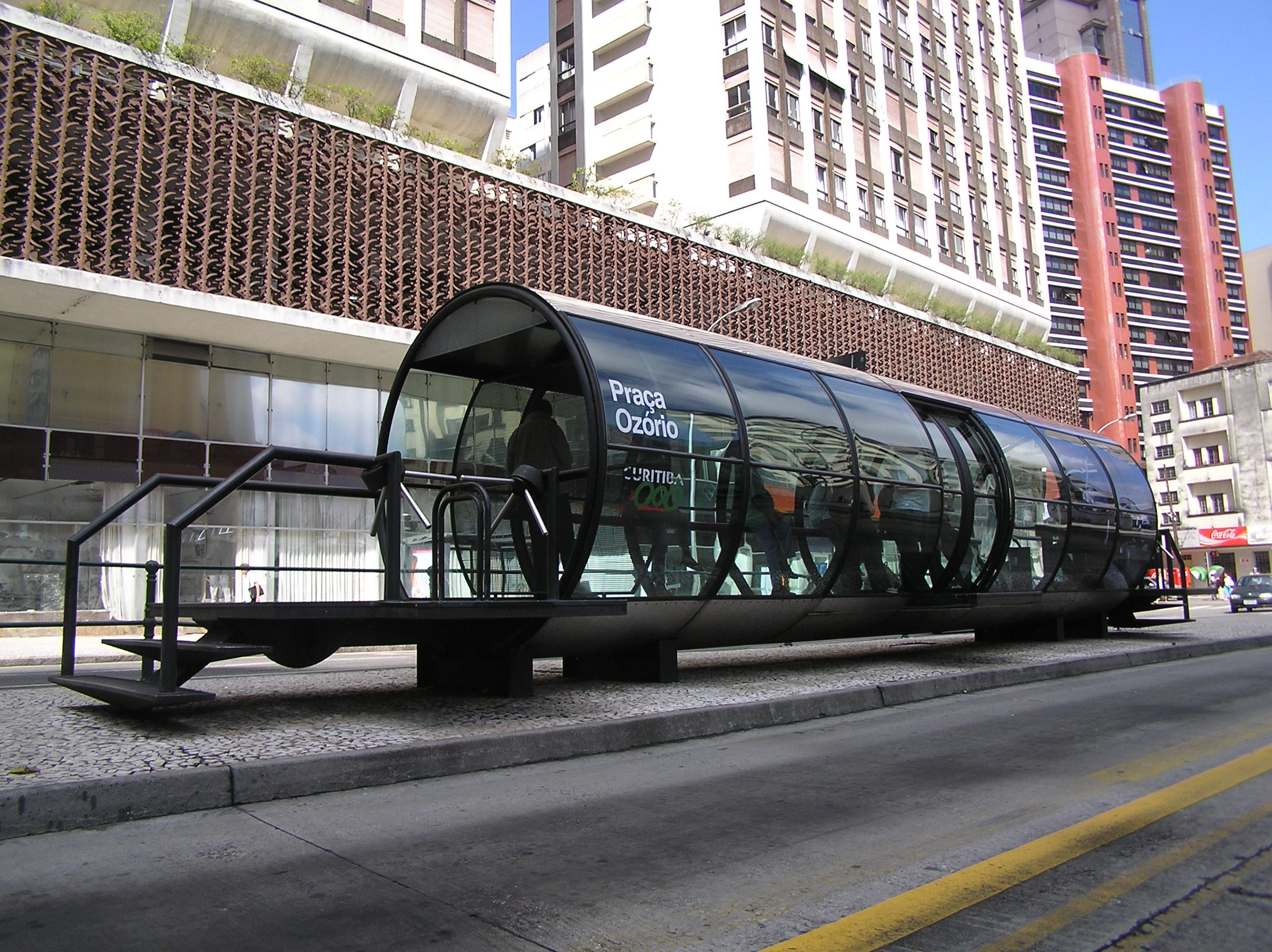
Curitiba's Integrated Transportation Network tube station.

Estação-Tubo (meaning literally "tube station", which are not to be confused with London Underground stations) are bus stops for Curitiba's Integrated Transportation Network in Brazil. Designed as futuristic tubes made from steel and glass, these bus stops allow fare payment in advance and boarding at the same level as the buses' floor, thus reducing stop time.

Tube stations were created in 1991 specifically for direct bus lines and since then have become an icon of urban planning in Curitiba. Some tube stations are served by more than one line, in which case there is a fare integration, meaning that a passenger, upon disembarking, can board a different bus from the same or different line without paying the fare again.

As of June 2014, there were 357 tube stations throughout Curitiba and its metropolitan region. Inside some tube stations there are Tubotecas, or small libraries. Citizens can borrow books with no need to register and return them to any other Tuboteca, any time. Tubotecas were a gift to the citizens to celebrate Curitiba's 320th anniversary.
