= Transit-oriented development =

Urban planning prioritising transit

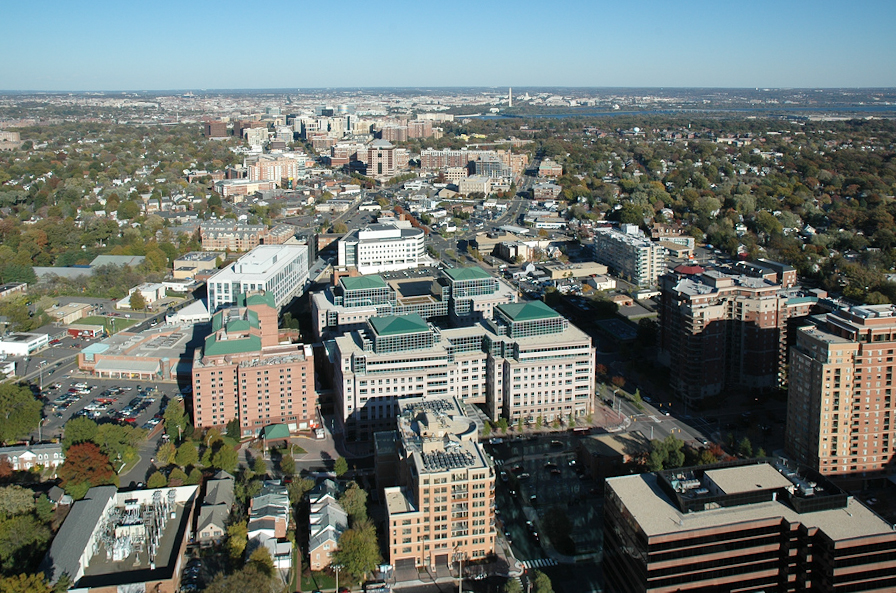
The local government of Arlington County, Virginia encourages transit-oriented development within 1/4 to 1/2 mile (400 to 800 m) from the county's Washington Metro rapid transit stations, with mixed-use development, bikesharing and walkability.

In urban planning, transit-oriented development (TOD) is a type of urban development that maximizes the amount of residential, business and leisure space within walking distance of public transport. It promotes a symbiotic relationship between dense, compact urban form and public transport use. In doing so, TOD aims to increase public transport ridership by reducing the use of private cars and by promoting sustainable urban growth.

TOD typically includes a central transit stop (such as a train station, or light rail or bus stop) surrounded by a high-density mixed-use area, with lower-density areas spreading out from this center, serving as part of an integrated transport network. TOD is also typically designed to be more walkable than other built-up areas, by using smaller block sizes and reducing the land area dedicated to automobiles. In some areas, it may include ferries. Areas that center a transit station as a hub while building residential-focused TOD development in the immediate area are known as transit villages.

The densest areas of TOD are normally located within a radius of 1/4 to 1/2 mile (400 to 800 m) around the central transit stop, as this is considered to be an appropriate scale for pedestrians, thus solving the last mile problem.

== Description ==
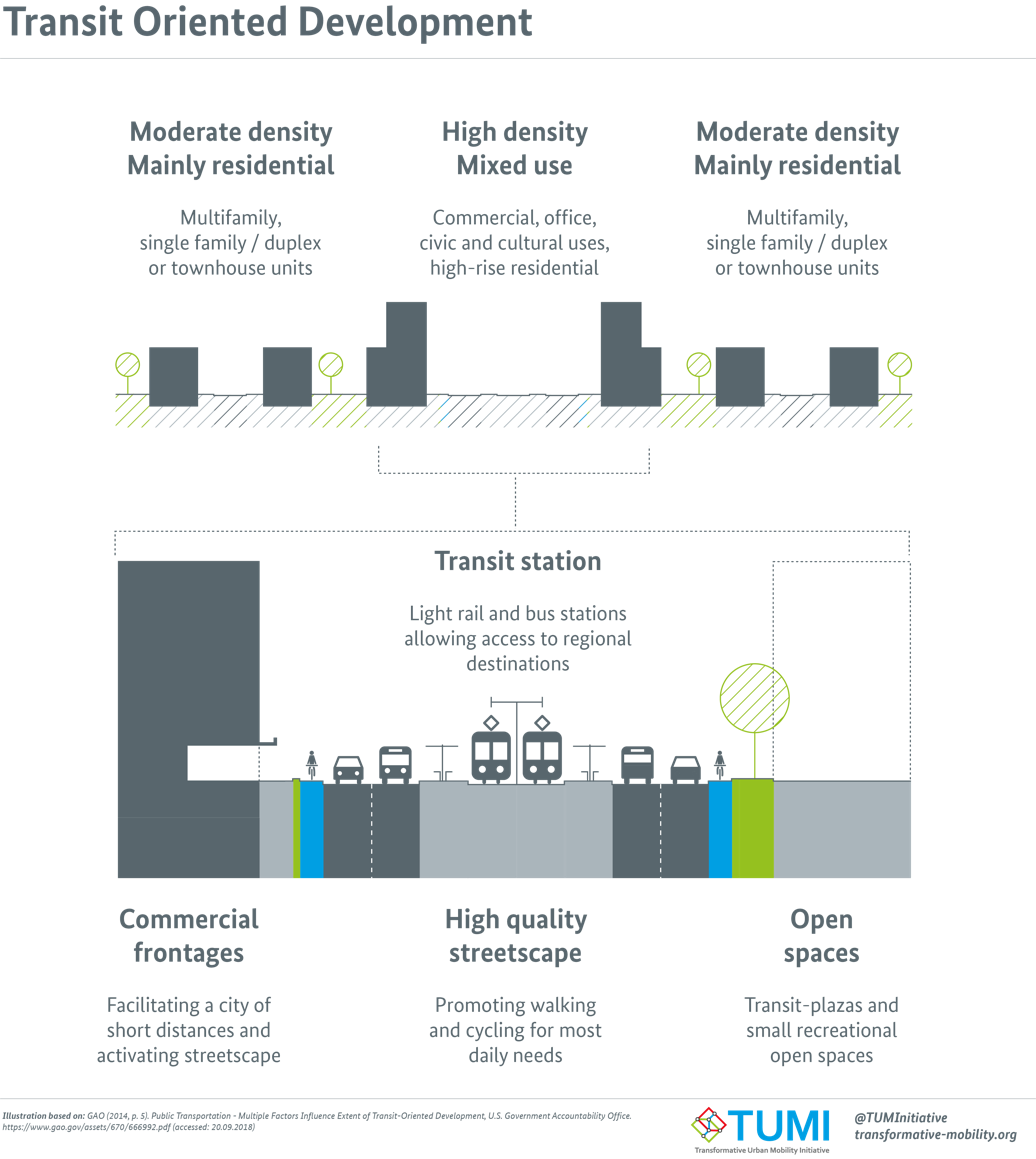
Transit Oriented Development

Many of the new towns created after World War II in Japan, Sweden, and France have many of the characteristics of TOD communities. In a sense, nearly all communities built on reclaimed land in the Netherlands or as exurban developments in Denmark have had the local equivalent of TOD principles integrated in their planning, including the promotion of bicycles for local use.

In the United States Frederick Law Olmstead a famous architect of the mid-late 19th century championed the idea and based the suburb of Riverside on the concept. It quickly became a model for the rapidly growing railway lines and communities of that era. A half-mile-radius circle has become the de facto standard for rail-transit catchment areas for TODs. A half mile (800 m) corresponds to the distance someone can walk in 10 minutes at 3 mph (4.8 km/h) and is a common estimate for the distance people will walk to get to a rail station. The half-mile ring is a little more than 500 acres (2.0 km^{2}) in size.

Transit-oriented development is sometimes distinguished by some planning officials from "transit-proximate development" because it contains specific features that are designed to encourage public transport use and differentiate the development from urban sprawl. A few examples of these features include mixed-use development that will use transit at all times of day, excellent pedestrian facilities such as high quality pedestrian crossings, narrow streets, and tapering of buildings as they become more distant from the public transport node. Another key feature of transit-oriented development that differentiates it from "transit-proximate development" is reduced amounts of parking for personal vehicles.

Transit-oriented development has many benefits including but not limited to:

- Easy access to transit, making it easy to get around without a car.
- Dense, due to TODs being made for getting around transportation, other than private vehicles, allowing access to stores and private business.
- Improved access to jobs and city services.
- Increased population near transit stops, such as a commuter rail stop, which ultimately increases transit ridership across the board.

Opponents of compact, or transit oriented development typically argue that Americans, and persons throughout the world, prefer low-density living, and that any policies that encourage compact development will result in substantial utility decreases and hence large social welfare costs. Proponents of compact development argue that there are large, often unmeasured benefits of compact development or that the American preference for low-density living is a misinterpretation made possible in part by substantial local government interference in the land market.

== In cities ==
Many cities throughout the world are developing TOD policy. Toronto, Portland, Montreal, San Francisco, and Vancouver among many other cities have developed, and continue to write policies and strategic plans, which aim to reduce automobile dependency and increase the use of public transit.

=== Latin America ===
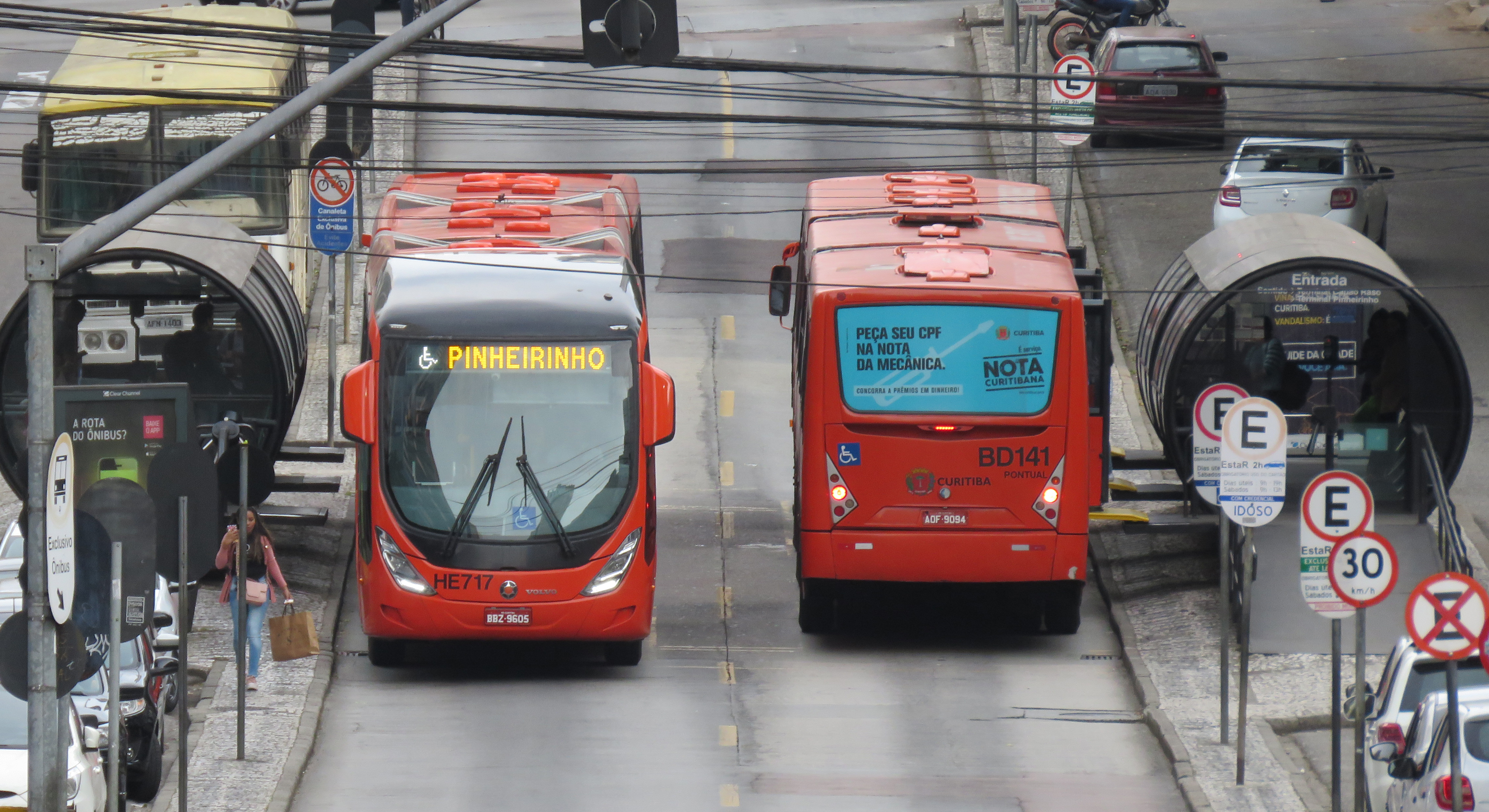
Curitiba's RIT in Praça do Japão

==== Curitiba, Brazil ====
One of the earliest and most successful examples of TOD is Curitiba, Brazil. Curitiba was organized into transport corridors very early on in its history. Over the years, it has integrated its zoning laws and transportation planning to place high-density development adjacent to high-capacity transportation systems, particularly its BRT corridors. Since the failure of its first rather grandiose city plan due to lack of funding, Curitiba has focused on working with economical forms of infrastructure, so it has arranged unique adaptations, such as bus routes (inexpensive infrastructure) with routing systems, limited access and speeds similar to subway systems. The source of innovation in Curitiba has been a unique form of participatory city planning that emphasizes public education, discussion and agreement.

==== Guatemala City, Guatemala ====
In an attempt to control the rapid growth of Guatemala City, the long-time mayor, Álvaro Arzú, implemented a plan to control growth based on transects along important arterial roads and exhibiting transit-oriented development (TOD) characteristics. The plan adopted POT (Plan de Ordenamiento Territorial) aims to allow the construction of taller mixed-use building structures right by large arterial roads. The buildings would gradually decrease in height and density as distance would increase from arterial roads. That is being implemented simultaneously with a bus rapid transit (BRT) system, called Transmetro.

==== Mexico City, Mexico ====
Mexico City has battled pollution for years. Many attempts have been made to orient citizens towards public transportation. Expansion of metro line, both subway and bus, have been instrumental. Following the example of Curitiba, many bus-lines were created on many of Mexico City's most important streets. The bus-line has taken two lanes from cars to be used only by the bus-line, increasing the flow for bus transit. The city has also made great attempts at increasing the number of bike lanes, including shutting down entire roads on certain days to be used only by bikers.

Car regulations have also increased in the city. New regulations prevent old cars from driving in the city, other cars from driving on certain days. Electric cars are allowed to be driven every day and have free parking. Decreasing the public space allocated to cars and increasing regulations have become a great annoyance among daily car users. The city hopes to push people to use more public transport.

=== North America ===
==== Canada ====
All major Canadian cities have transit oriented development policies and implementations. The main purposes of these policies has been to kerb suburban sprawl, and to increase housing supply amidst a housing crisis. In addition, it comes in response to a shifting population demographic that prefers high density living.

Some cities, such as Toronto, Ottawa, and especially Vancouver, have a long history of building new communities near transit, and they often plan development and rapid transit simultaneously. Others, such as Calgary and Montréal, have only implemented TOD policies recently, and there is some debate as to whether it is better to build new transit to existing high density neighbourhoods, or build high density neighbourhoods near existing transit.

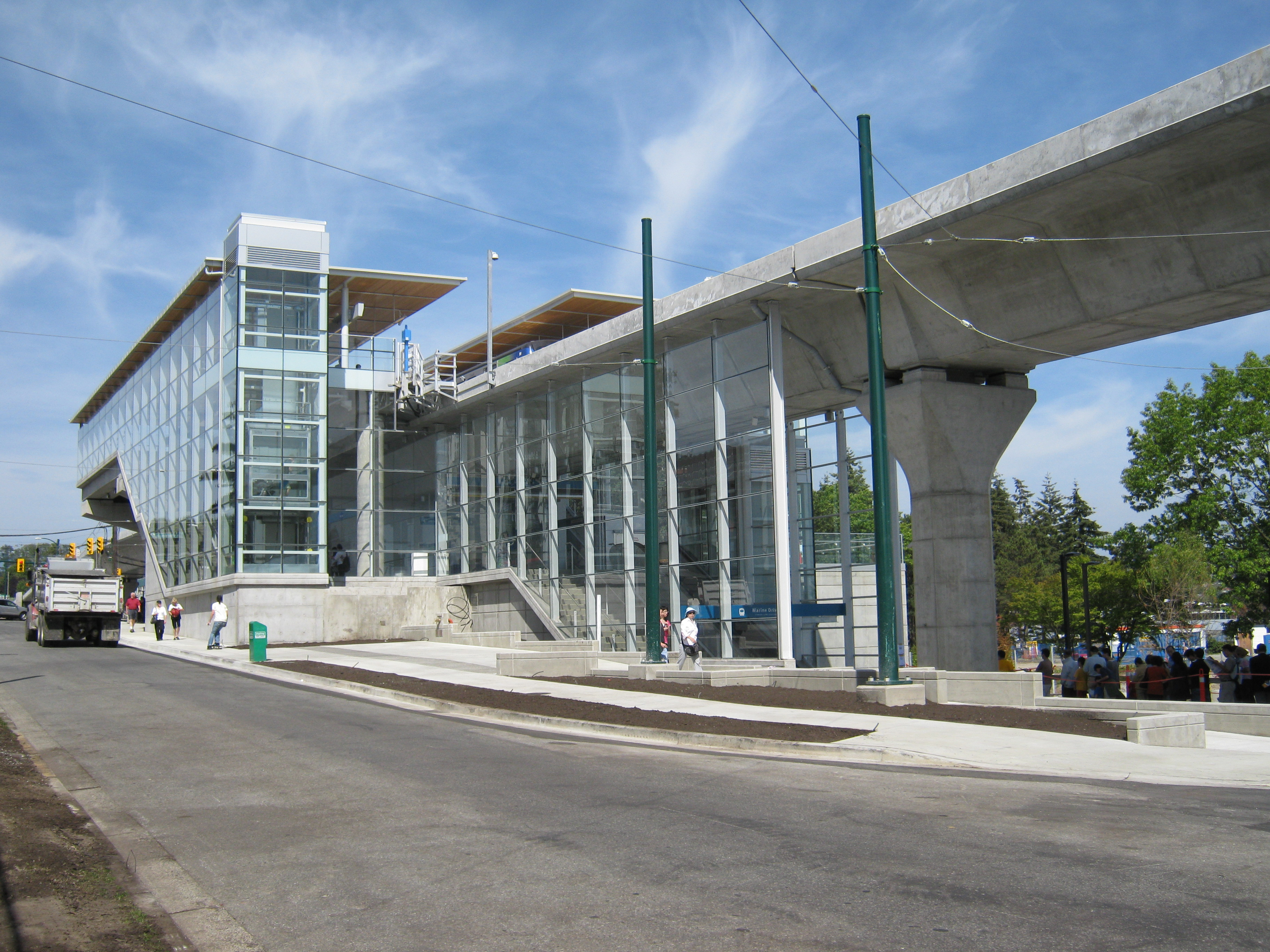
Marine Drive station in Vancouver on opening day (2009)

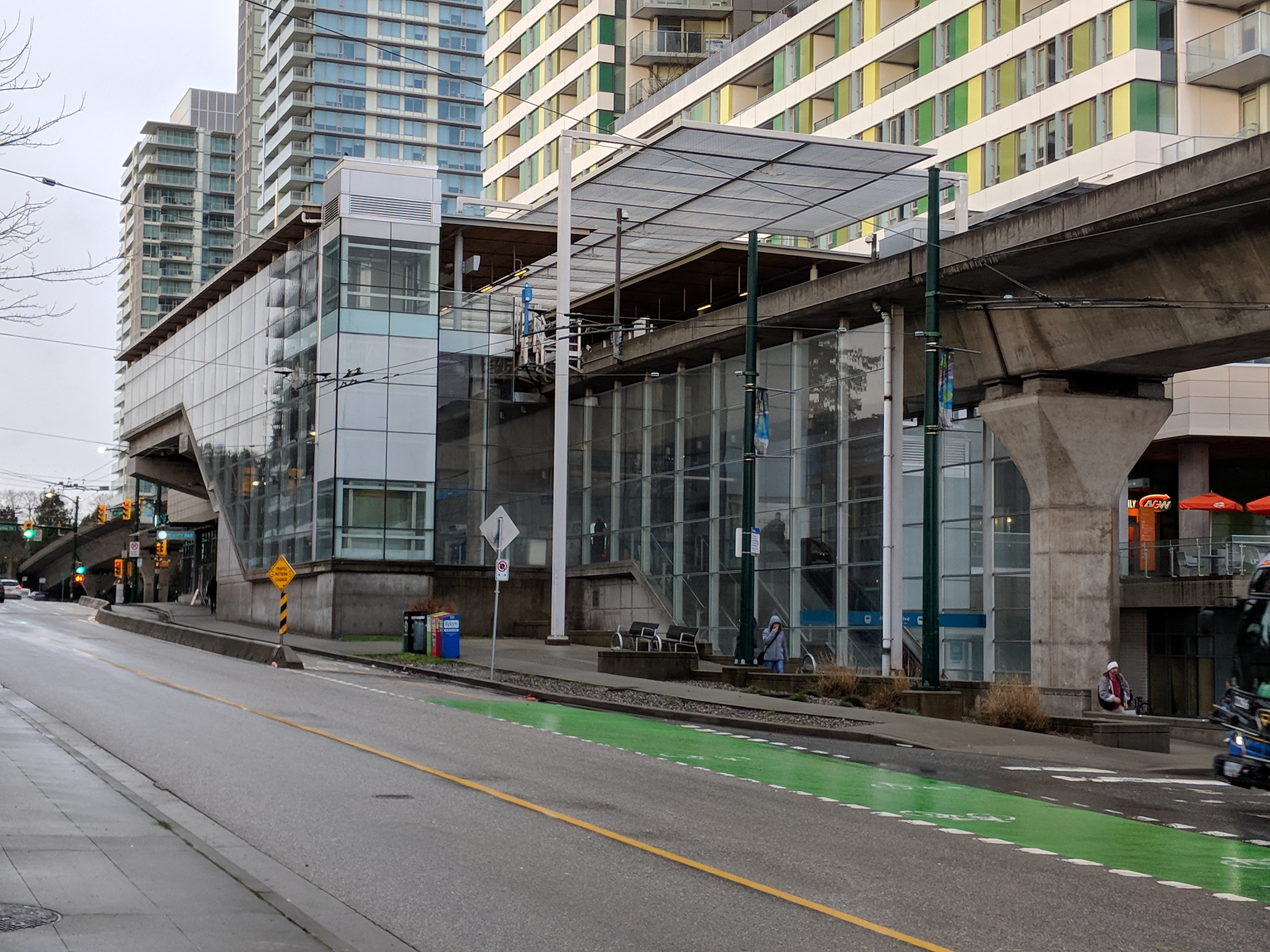
High-rises have since been built around the station (2018).

===== Calgary, Alberta =====
Calgary's Transit Oriented Development (TOD) has been evolving largely around stations along Calgary's Light Rail Transit (LRT) system, also known as the CTrain network. Although Calgary's CTrain system has been around since 1981, TOD activity has been fairly recent, with much of development taking place since 2010. Most of the transit oriented development has taken place along the LRT system's Red Line especially around stations of the northwest leg with areas around stations at Brentwood, Dalhousie, and Banff Trail having seen the most development. Brentwood Station for example, with multi-building developments such as University City, has seen almost 900 residential units built in the last eight years within the 600m radius of Brentwood station, as well as proposed developments that are in the works. On the south leg of the Red Line the massive Midtown Station proposal is a reversal from previous TOD builds where development is built around existing stations. In the case of Midtown Station, the proposal is along the CTrain line, but includes building a new station solely for the purpose of serving the development.

For The City of Calgary, TOD's are an ongoing process, but the city has published policy guidelines and implementation strategies for Transit Oriented Development.

===== Edmonton, Alberta =====
Most of the suburban high rises were not along major rail lines like other cities until recently, when there has been incentive to do so. Century Park is a growing condo community in southern Edmonton at the south end of the Edmonton LRT system. It will include low to high rise condos, recreational services, shops, restaurants, and a fitness centre. Edmonton has also had a transit-proximate development for some time in the northeastern suburbs at Clareview which includes a large park and ride, and low rise apartments among big box stores and associated power center parking. Edmonton is also looking into some new TODs in various parts of the city. In the northeast, there are plans to redevelop underutilized land at two sites around existing LRT, Fort Road and Stadium station. In the west, there is plans to have some medium density condos in the Glenora neighborhood along a future LRT route as well as a TOD in the southeast in the Strathearn neighborhood along the same future LRT on existing low rise apartments.

===== Kitchener-Waterloo =====
The Ion light rail line in Kitchener-Waterloo initiated large amounts of new construction along the corridor, despite the city region being the smallest in North America to host a tramway. The first stage of the line created 19 000 new housing units along its length, as well as large scale industrial and commercial developments, valued at $5 billion.

===== Montreal, Quebec =====
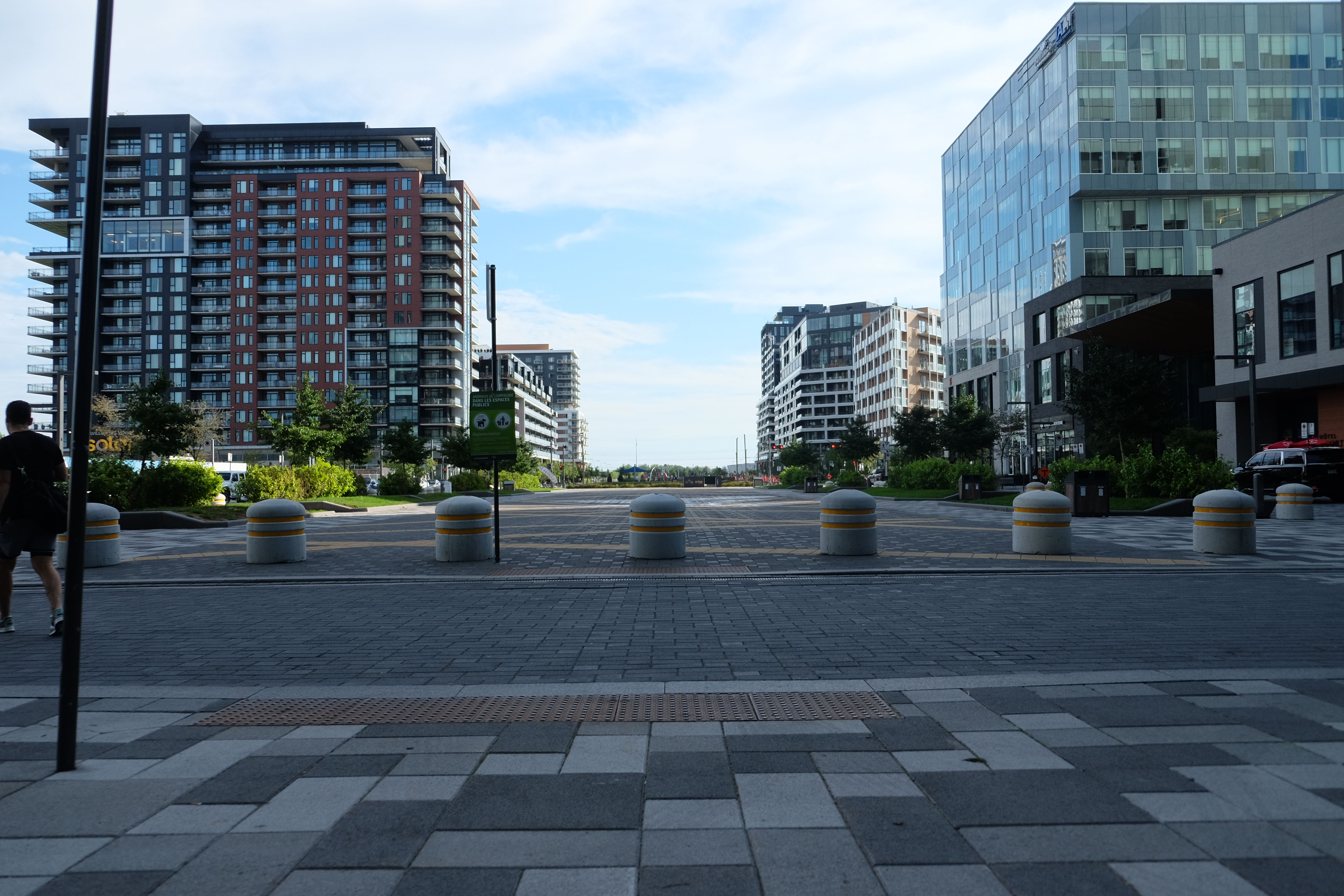
Transit oriented developed next to Du Quartier station

According to the Metropolitan Development and Planning Regulation as of late 2011, 40% of new households will be built as TOD neighborhoods.

===== Ottawa, Ontario =====
Ottawa encourages high density development within 600m of all rapid transit stations, including both the bus rapid transit Transitway and the city's urban rail system, with the goal of creating feature complete mixed use communities within walking distance to transit. The city simultaneously discourages auto oriented development, such as parking lots, in the same areas.

This has had the effect of creating many tower clusters far outside the city centre, with stations like Lincoln Fields and Lycée Claudel having entire neighbourhoods appear around them.

===== Toronto, Ontario =====
Toronto has a longstanding policy of encouraging new construction along the route of its primary Yonge Street subway line. Most notable are the development of the Yonge and Eglinton area in the 1960s and 1970s; And the present development of the 2 km of the Yonge Street corridor north of Sheppard Avenue, which began in the late 1980s. In the period since 1997 alone the latter stretch has seen the appearance of a major new shopping centre and the building and occupation of over twenty thousand new units of condominium housing. Since the opening of the Sheppard subway line in 2002, there is a condominium construction boom along the route on Sheppard Avenue East between Yonge Street and Don Mills Road.

In addition to the subway, transit oriented development has also started to be prioritised for regional rail stations, such as East Harbour GO.

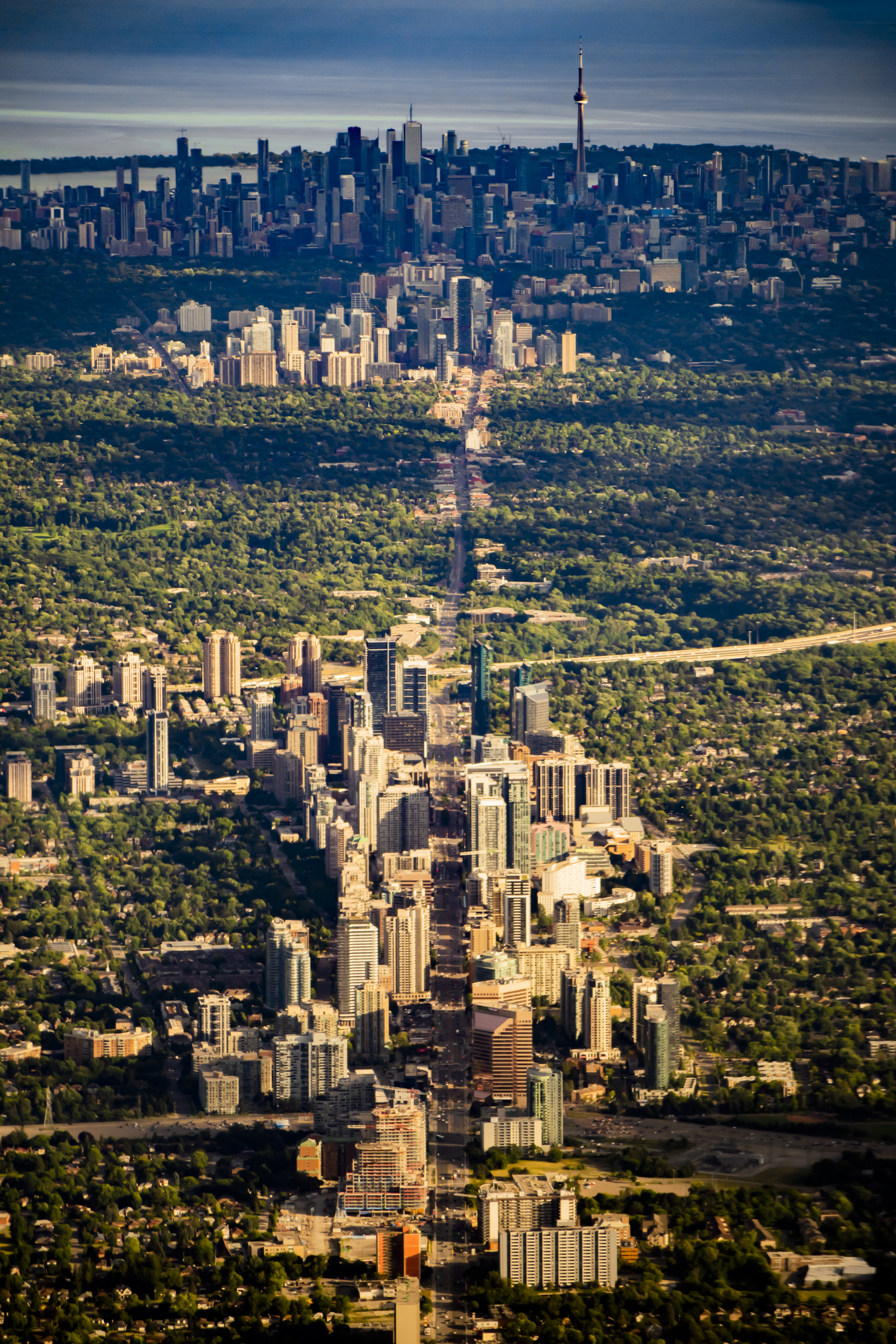
Yonge Street and the transit oriented development along it.

===== Vancouver, British Columbia =====
Vancouver has a strong history of creating new development around its SkyTrain lines and building regional town centres at major stations and transit corridors. In addition, the Government of British Columbia has legislated policy that all development within 800m of rail, and within 400m of bus interchanges, must be high density. Of note is the Metrotown area of the suburb of Burnaby, British Columbia near the Metrotown SkyTrain Station. The areas around stations have spurred the development of billions of dollars of high-density real estate, with multiple high-rises near the many stations, prompting concerns about rapid gentrification.

===== Winnipeg, Manitoba =====
There is currently one TOD being built in Winnipeg beside the rapid transit corridor. It is known as The Yards at Fort Rouge, and was spearheaded by the developer Gem Equities. In phase two of the southwest rapid transit corridor, there will be four more TODs. This phase is an interesting example of the use of fine arts in parallel with transit planning, making several of the stations sites for public art related to the social history of the area.

==== United States ====
===== Arlington County, Virginia =====
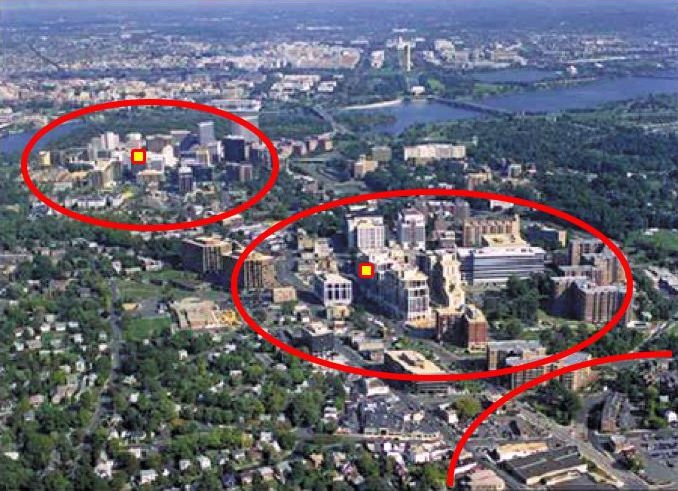
Aerial view of Rosslyn-Ballston corridor in Arlington County, Virginia. High density, mixed use development is concentrated within ¼–½ mile from the Rosslyn, Court House and Clarendon Washington Metro stations (shown in red), with limited density outside that area.

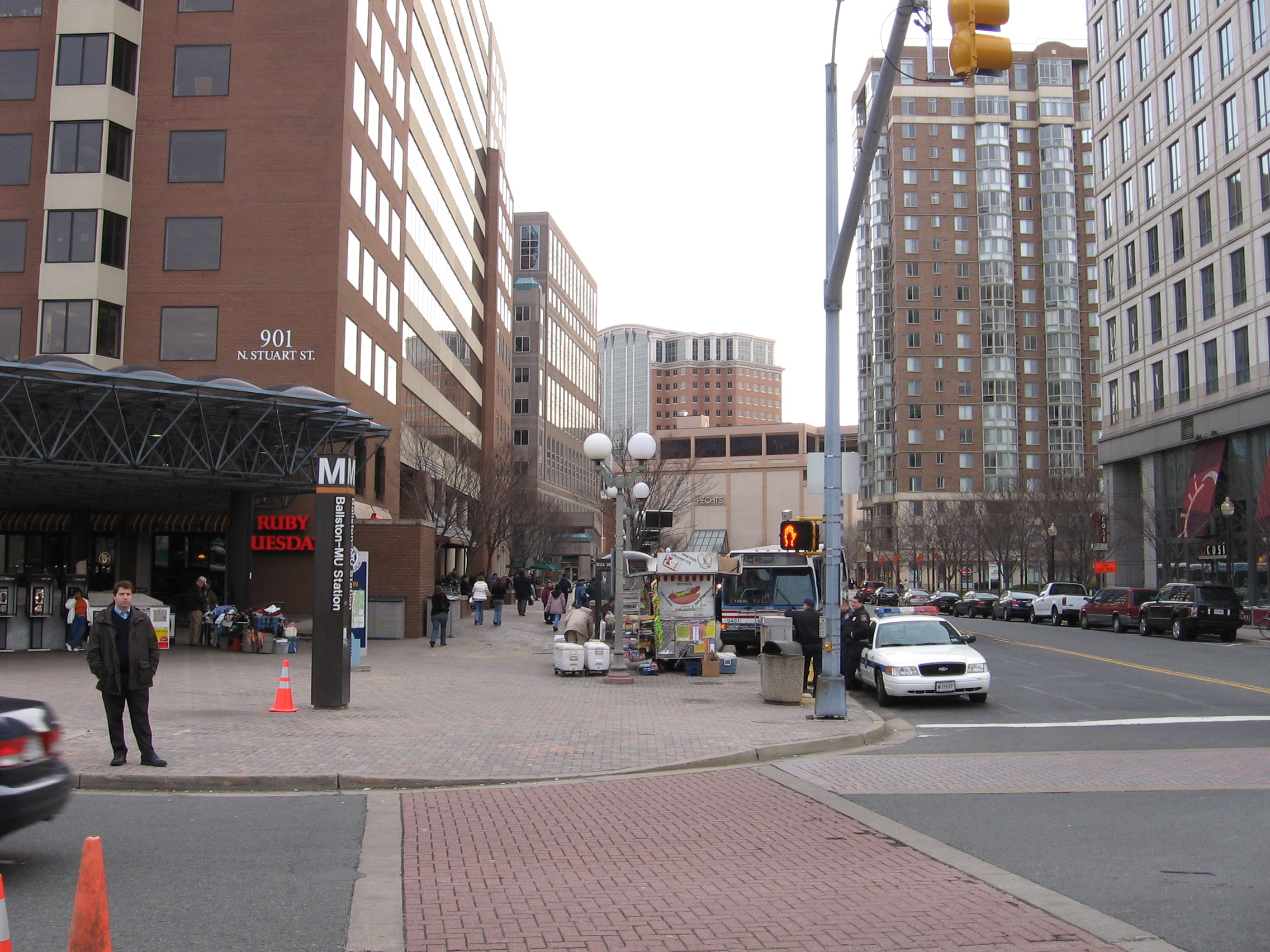
Street-level view of the area around the Ballston–MU station, also in Arlington County, Virginia. Note the mixed-use development (from left to right: ground floor retail under apartment building, office buildings, shopping mall (at the end of the street), apartment building, office building with ground floor retail), pedestrian oriented facilities including wide sidewalk, and bus stop facility in the center distance. Parking in this location is limited, relatively expensive, and located underground.

For over 30 years, the government has pursued a development strategy of concentrating much of its new development within 1/4 to 1/2 mile (400 to 800 m) from the county's Washington Metro rapid transit stations and the high-volume bus lines of Columbia Pike. Within the transit areas, the government has a policy of encouraging mixed-use and pedestrian- and transit-oriented development. Some of these "urban village" communities include Rosslyn, Ballston, Clarendon, Courthouse, Pentagon City, Crystal City, Lyon Village, Shirlington, Virginia Square, and Westover.

In 2002, Arlington received the EPA's National Award for Smart Growth Achievement for "Overall Excellence in Smart Growth" — the first ever granted by the agency.

In September 2010, Arlington County, Virginia, in partnership with Washington, D.C., opened Capital Bikeshare, a bicycle sharing system. By February 2011, Capital Bikeshare had 14 stations in the Pentagon City, Potomac Yard, and Crystal City neighborhoods in Arlington. Arlington County also announced plans to add 30 stations in fall 2011, primarily along the densely populated corridor between the Rosslyn and Ballston neighborhoods, and 30 more in 2012.

===== New Jersey =====
New Jersey has become a national leader in promoting Transit Village development through a program known as the Transit Village initiative. The New Jersey Department of Transportation established the Transit Village Initiative in 1999, offering multi-agency assistance and grants from the annual $1 million Transit village fund to any municipality with a ready to go project specifying appropriate mixed land-use strategy, available property, station-area management, and commitment to affordable housing, job growth, and culture. Transit village development must also preserve the architectural integrity of historically significant buildings. Transit Village districts are defined by the half mile radius surrounding the transit station. To become a Transit Village, towns must meet the following criteria: have existing transit, demonstrate a willingness to grow, adopt a transit-oriented-development redevelopment plan or zoning ordinance, identify specific TOD sites and projects, identify bicycle and pedestrian improvements, and identify "place making" efforts near the transit station, such as community events, celebrations, and other cultural or artistic events.

Since 1999 the state has made 35 Transit Village designations, which are in different stages of development:

Pleasantville (1999), Morristown (1999), Rutherford (1999), South Amboy (1999), South Orange (1999), Riverside (2001), Rahway (2002), Metuchen (2003), Belmar (2003), Bloomfield (2003), Bound Brook (2003), Collingswood (2003), Cranford (2003), Matawan (2003), New Brunswick (2005), Journal Square/Jersey City (2005), Netcong (2005), Elizabeth/Midtown (2007), Burlington City (2007), the City of Orange Township (2009), Montclair (2010), Somerville (2010), Linden (2010), West Windsor (2012), East Orange (2012), Dunellen (2012), Summit (2013), Plainfield (2014), Park Ridge (2015), Irvington (2015), Hackensack (2016), Long Branch (2016), Asbury Park (2017), Newark (2021), and Atlantic City (2023).

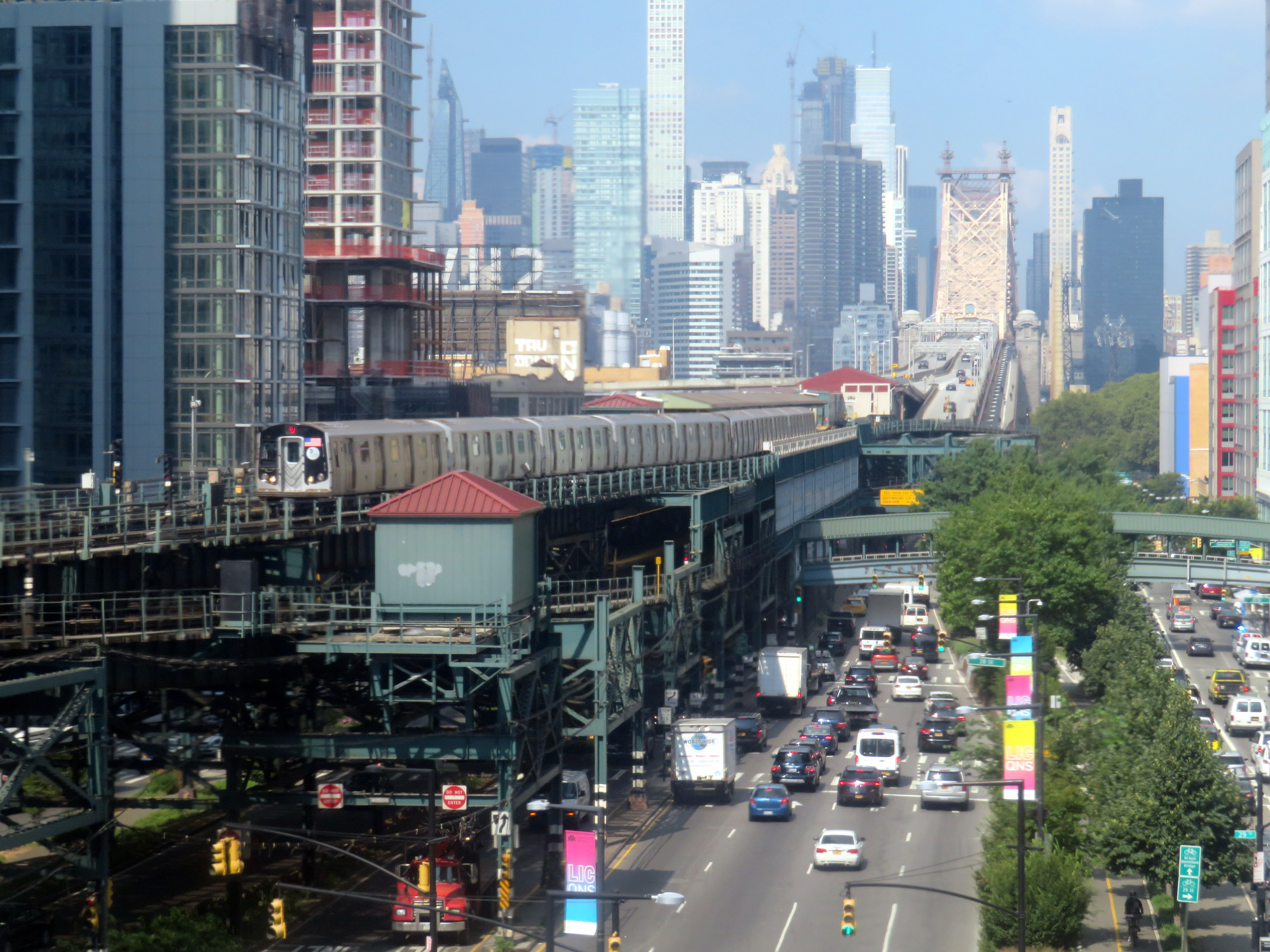
Long Island City, a transit-oriented community with the Queensboro Plaza subway station shown, one of the many subway stations in Long Island City

===== New York City =====
Many neighborhoods in New York City are close to a New York City Subway station, which allows easy transport throughout the cities’ neighborhoods and central business districts. To maximize the usage of the New York City Subway, many subway stations are surrounded by transit-oriented development, with high-density residential and commercial buildings surrounding the subway station. Neighborhoods include, but are not limited to, Downtown Brooklyn, Midtown Manhattan, Long Island City, and Sunnyside. Many downtowns in the Greater New York Area also are walkable with a central regional rail station.

===== Pittsburgh, Pennsylvania =====
The East Liberty neighborhood is nearing completion of a $150 million Transit Oriented Development centered around the reconfigured East Liberty Station on the city's Martin Luther King Jr. East Busway. The development included improved access to the station with a new pedestrian bridge and pedestrian walkways that increase the effective walkshed of the station. The East Busway is a fixed guideway route that offers riders an 8-minute ride from East Liberty to Pittsburgh's Downtown.

===== Salt Lake City Metro Area, Utah =====
The Salt Lake City Metro Area has seen a strong proliferation of transit-oriented developments due to the construction of new transit lines within the Utah Transit Authority's TRAX, FrontRunner and streetcar lines. New developments in West Valley, Farmington, Murray, Provo, Kaysville, Sugarhouse and downtown Salt Lake City have seen rapid growth and construction despite the economic downturn. The population along the Wasatch Front has reached 2.5 million and is expected to grow 50% over the next two decades. At 29.8%, Utah's population growth more than doubled the population growth of the nation (13.2%), with a vast majority of this growth occurring along the Wasatch Front.

Transportation infrastructure has been vastly upgraded in the past decade as a result of the 2002 Olympic Winter Games and the need to support the growth in population. This has created a number of transit-oriented commercial and residential projects to be proposed and completed.

===== San Francisco Bay Area, California =====
The San Francisco Bay Area includes nine counties and 101 cities, including San Jose, San Francisco, Oakland and Fremont. Local and regional governments encourage transit-oriented development to decrease traffic congestion, protect natural areas, promote public health and increase housing options. The region has designated Priority Development Areas and Priority Conservation Areas. Current population forecasts for the region predict that it will grow by 2 million people by 2035 due to both the natural birth rate and job creation, and estimate that 50% of this growth can be accommodated in Priority Development Areas through transit-oriented development.

Major transit village projects have been developed over the past 20 years at several stations linked to the Bay Area Rapid Transit (BART) system. In their 1996 book, Transit Villages in the 21st Century, Michael Bernick and Robert Cervero identified emerging transit villages at several BART stations, including Pleasant Hill / Contra Costa Centre, Fruitvale, Hayward and Richmond. MacArthur Station is a relatively new development, with construction beginning in 2011 and scheduled for completion after 2019.

===== Chicago =====
Chicago passed its first TOD ordinances in 2013. The city of Chicago started building TODs around rail stations throughout the metropolitan area. There have been concerns that these TODs were excluding minorities since most of the TODs were built in mainly white areas therefore leaving minorities out of the picture when it came to access to transit oriented development neighborhoods. The 2020 eTOD Policy Plan was created to fix the issues from the previous TOD plans, by creating more TOD developments in minority areas.

=== Asia and Oceania ===
==== Hong Kong ====
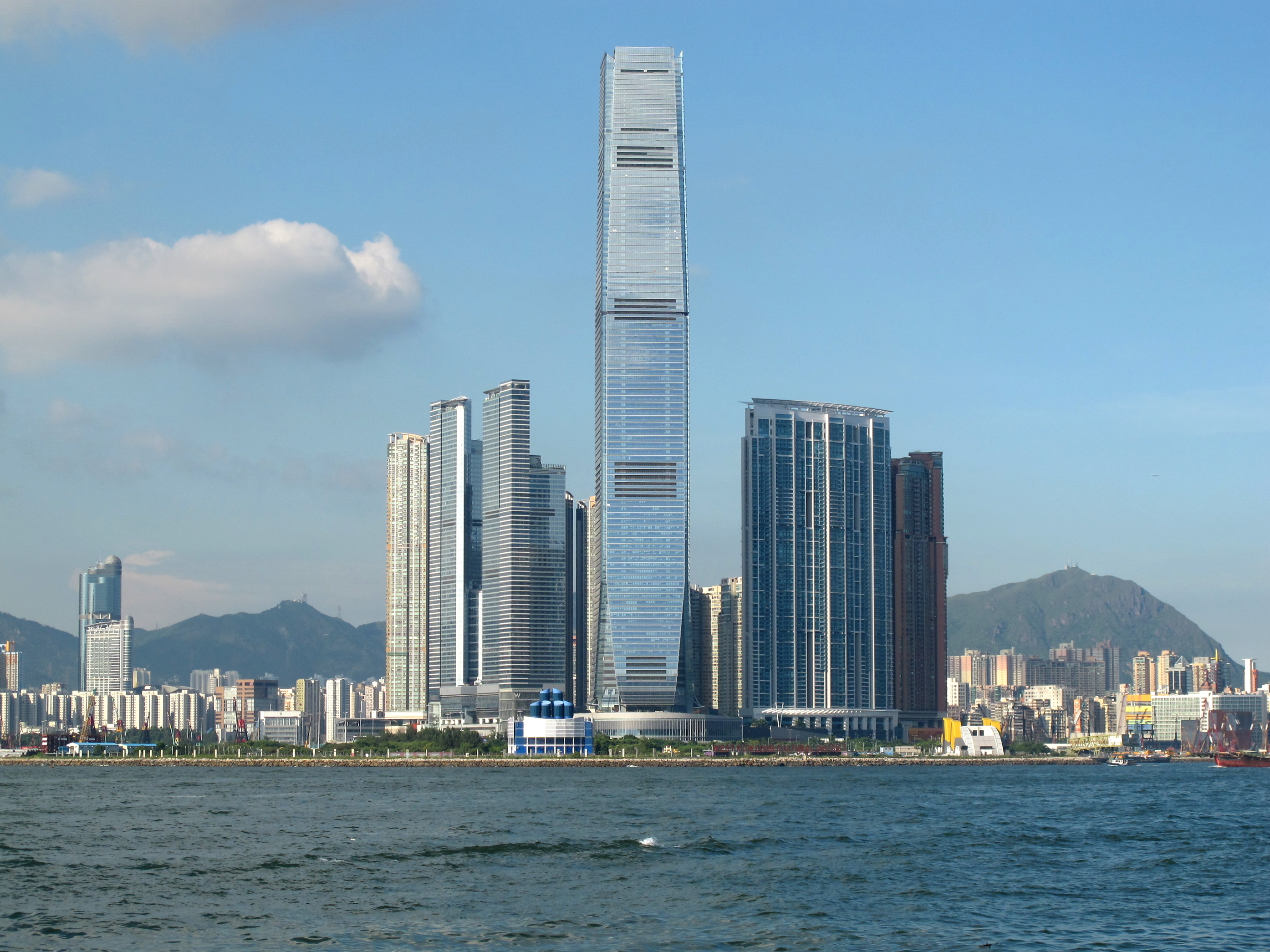
Union Square, a transit-oriented development centred on Kowloon station, Hong Kong

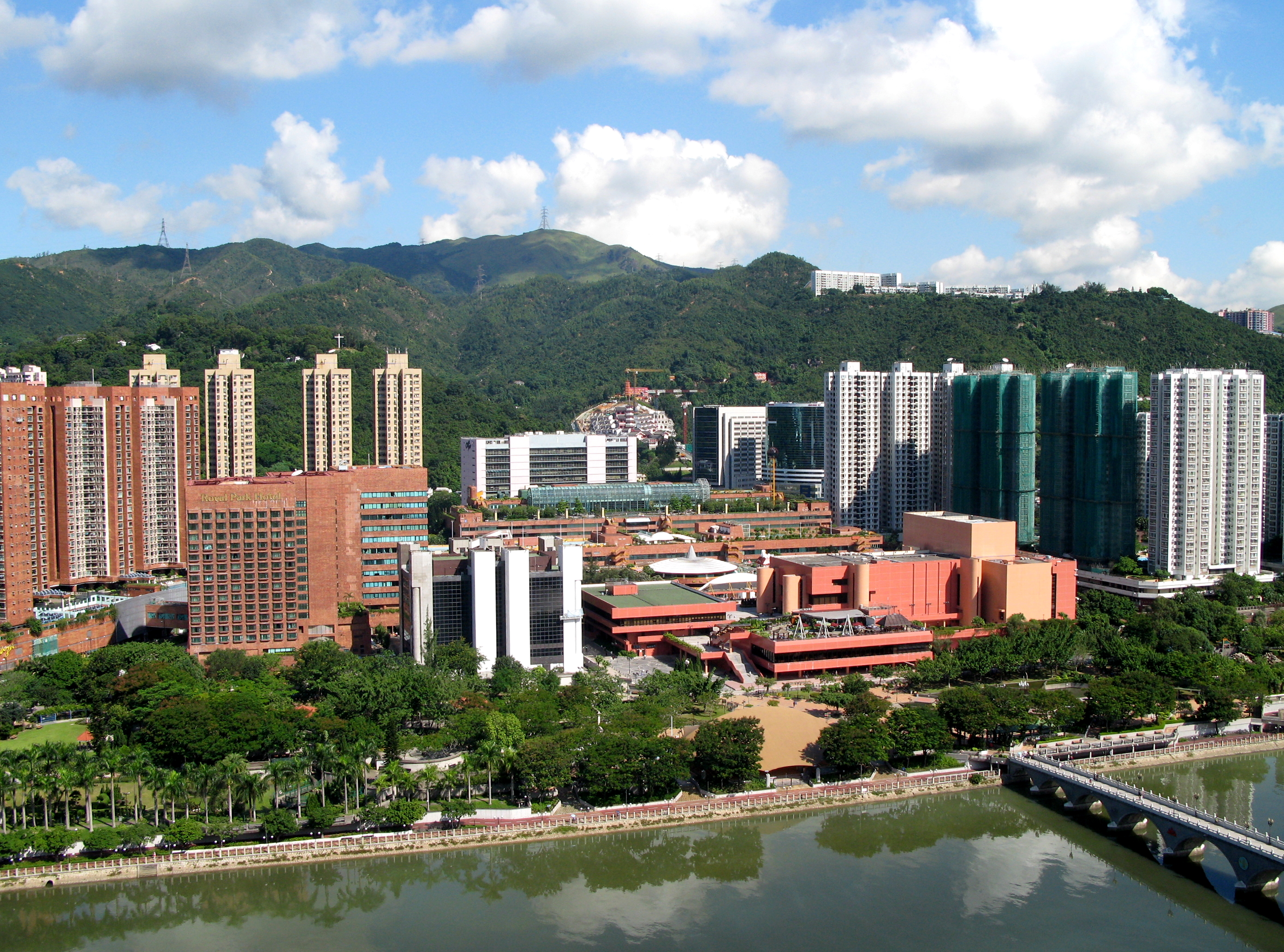
Sha Tin town centre, built around the Sha Tin railway station

Compared to other developed economies, the car ownership rate in Hong Kong is very low, and approximately 90% of all trips are made by public transport.

In the mid-20th century, no railway was built until an area was well developed. However, in recent decades, Hong Kong has started to have some TODs, where a railway is built simultaneously with residential development above or nearby, dubbed the "Rail plus Property" (R+P) Model. Examples include:

- LOHAS Park
- Olympian City
- Tung Chung
- Union Square

The Rail plus Property model, which captures the value capture of land surrounding new public transport, allows Hong Kong to be one of the world's few profitable public transit systems, generating a profit of $1.5 billion in 2014.

==== Malaysia ====
Bandar Malaysia is an upcoming development by 1Malaysia Development Berhad (1MDB).

==== Indonesia ====
Transit oriented development (TOD) areas are urban areas designed to integrate transit functions with people, activities, buildings and public spaces that aim to optimize access to public transportation. In Jakarta, PT MRT Jakarta (Perseroda) will build TOD areas at five points along the south-north corridor of MRT Jakarta. The five points are Blok M, Lebak Bulus and Fatmawati in South Jakarta, as well as Dukuh Atas and Istora Senayan in Central Jakarta. Each area has its own theme and concept according to the characteristics and needs of the local community. The TOD area is expected to provide benefits to the community, such as reducing congestion and air pollution, increasing a healthy and active lifestyle, expanding employment and economic opportunities, and creating added value for property.

One example of the Dukuh Atas TOD is the transport hub that is being built by PT Moda Integrasi Transportasi Jabodetabek (MITJ) on Jalan Blora, in front of Sudirman Station. Transport hubs are vehicle exchange points and transit points where there is community interaction using transit. This transport hub will be a 20-storey building containing the Jakarta MRT office and other facilities. This transport hub will also be connected to the 250-meter Multipurpose Crossing Bridge (JPM) which connects various modes of public transportation in the Dukuh Atas area. The transport hub is expected to be operational in 2023.

Many TOD are now being constructed in Greater Jakarta metro area such as Citra Sentul Raya and Dukuh Atas TOD. TOD are also being constructed in cities like Surabaya, Medan, and Palembang.

==== Thailand ====
There has been a proposal to develop Transit-Oriented Development (TOD) around mass transit stations in Bangkok, as well as around high-speed rail stations in cities such as Ayutthaya, Khon Kaen, Makkasan, Pattaya, and Si Racha. In addition, there have been proposals for TOD around main regional railway stations. The TOD proposal aims to create walkable, mixed-use communities centered around transit stations, taking advantage of their convenient transportation access. This development is expected to bring a range of benefits, including increased economic activity, reduced traffic congestion, and improved quality of life for residents.

==== Australia ====
===== Melbourne, Victoria =====
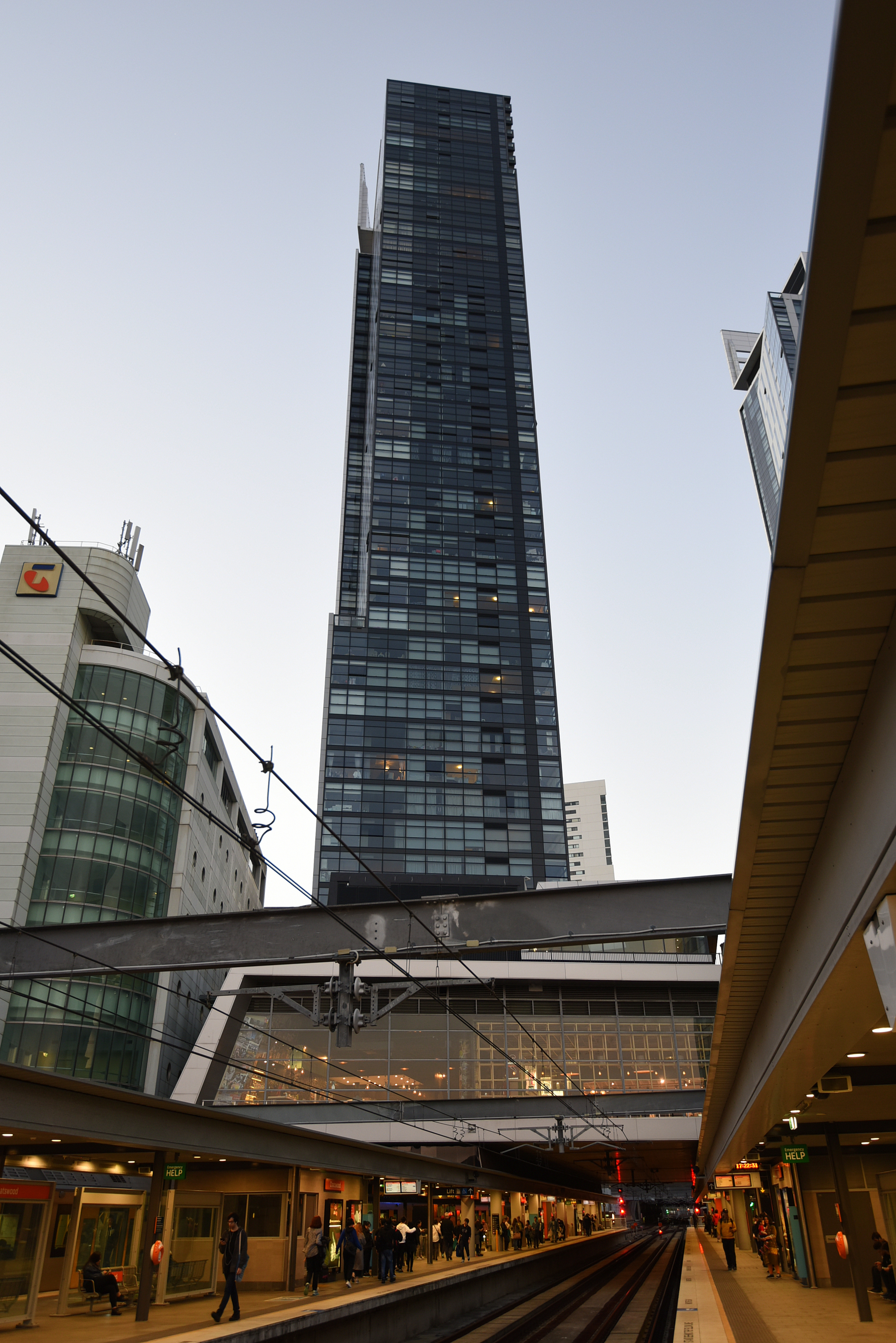
Chatswood Station in Sydney. Trains run through the integrated station, shopping and apartment complex

Melbourne, Victoria is expected to reach a population of 5 million by 2030 with the overwhelming majority of its residents relying on private automobiles. Since the turn of the century, sporadic efforts have been made by various levels of government to implement transit-oriented development principles. However, a lack of commitment to funding public transport infrastructure, resulting to overcrowding and amending zoning laws has dramatically slowed progress toward sustainable development for the city.

===== Milton, Queensland =====
Milton, an inner suburb of Brisbane, has been identified as Queensland's first transit-oriented development under the Queensland Government's South East Queensland Regional Plan. Milton railway station will undergo a multimillion-dollar revamp as part of the development of The Milton Residences to promote and encourage residents to embrace rail travel. This will include a new ticketing office, new public amenities, increased visibility across platforms and new and improved access points off Milton Road and Railway Terrace.

===== Sydney, New South Wales =====
The New South Wales State Government has actively encouraged developments around stations on the Sydney Trains and Sydney Metro networks through its Priority Precincts plan. Several stations such as Chatswood, Burwood, Parramatta and Rhodes have had large scale apartment developments built within close proximity during the 2010s. New apartment and office tower developments along the future Sydney Metro stations are being planned as integrated developments with the stations themselves. Examples of this include Victoria Cross station and Crows Nest station whilst existing stations such as Castle Hill and Epping have also had intensified development.

The Minns government has been embarking on a mission of reform regarding housing stock by up-zoning areas near stations despite the opposition of some local councils.

===== Newcastle, New South Wales =====
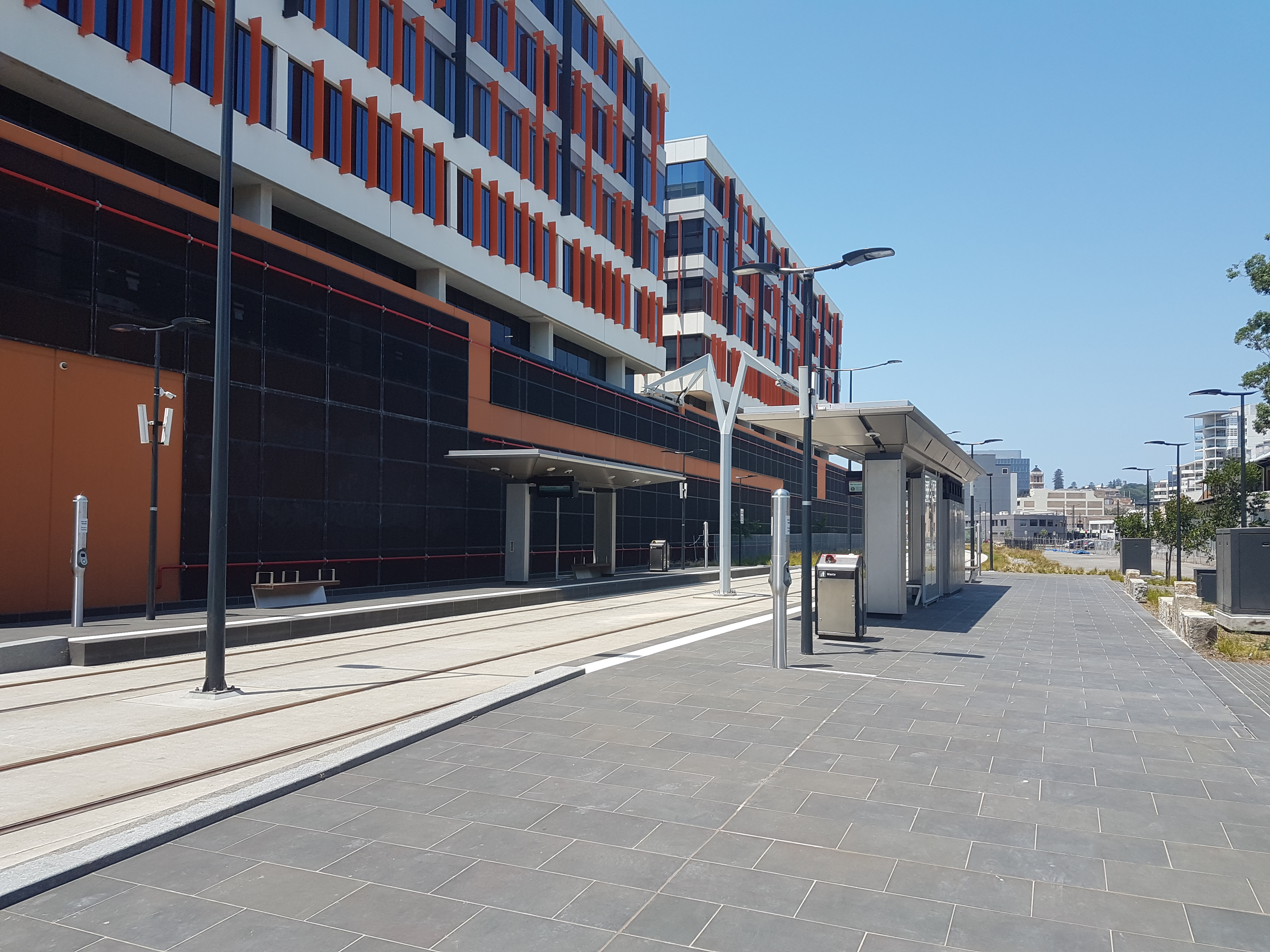
Honeysuckle Station, part of the Newcastle Light Rail, in front of new mixed-use urban developments

Honeysuckle is an urban renewal developed on 50 hectares of former industrial land in Newcastle, NSW. This project, carried out by the Honeysuckle Development Corporation, has at its core the emergence of mixed residential and commercial areas commutable to the Newcastle Light Rail and other alternative transport methods.

=== Europe ===
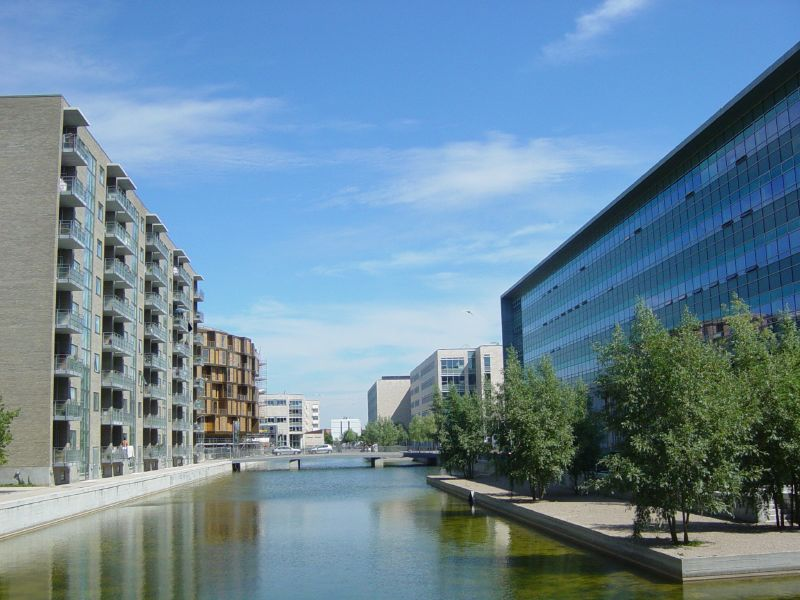
Karen Blixen Park, Ørestad (Copenhagen), Denmark

The term transit-oriented development, as a US-born concept, is rarely used in Europe, although many of the measures advocated in US transit-oriented development are also stressed in Europe. Many European cities have long been built around transit systems and there has thus often been little or no need to differentiate this type of development with a special term as has been the case in the US. An example of this is Copenhagen's Finger Plan from 1947, which embodied many transit-oriented development aspects and is still used as an overall planning framework today. Recently, scholars and technicians have taken interest in the concept, however.

==== Dublin, Ireland ====
The area around Connolly station, in Dublin's City Centre is a candidate for much needed mixed use development. Additionally, sketches for the area around Heuston railway station as-well as regional city stations in Cork, Limerick, Galway and Waterford have been drawn up in Iarnród Eireann's strategy 2027. which also includes plans for the expansion of the Dublin Area Rapid Transit through the DART+ programme.

Galway, Ireland

Galway County Council have created an Urban Framework Plan for the townlands of Garraun North and South, located west of Oranmore, home to Oranmore railway station and is less than 10 km (6.2 miles) from Galway city centre. The plan describes Garraun as a "Flagship development for County Galway, setting new standards in sustainable contemporary living, and with excellent access to public transport."

The plan includes an expansion of the station's car park to two stories and green space above, which will roll down into a public park. The plan describes three-storey mixed use buildings on the main road and lots of residential space. South of the railway station, an "EcoPark" is planned.

==== Paris, France ====
La Défense district, west of central Paris

Whereas the city of Paris has a centuries-long history, its main frame dates to the 19th century. The subway network was made to solve both linkage between the five main train stations and local transportation assets for citizens. The whole area of Paris City has metro stations no more than 500 metres apart. Recent bicycle and car rental systems (Vélib' and Autolib') also ease travel, in the very same way that TOD emphasizes. So do the new trams linking suburbs close to Paris proper, and tramline 3 around the edge of the city of Paris.

The La Défense area is an example of a large scale transit-oriented district.

==== Stedenbaan, Netherlands ====
In the southern part of the Randstad a neighborhood according to the principles of TOD will be built.

=== Iran ===
In Isfahan the subway is used for a TOD program.

== Impacts ==
=== Environmental ===
TOD has been shown to reduce multiple types of emissions in Los Angeles during life-cycle assessments; greenhouse gasses, respiratory irritants, and smog forming emissions can be reduced by approximately 30% in TOD when compared to lower density areas. This is attributed to various factors including residents having more travel options, reduced travel distances for everyday activities, and higher density housing reducing energy use per residence. In Dhaka TOD can also aid in reducing travel related CO_{2} emissions on a community level, specifically for work and school trips, due to residents traveling less distance to these locations. And it is suggested that the improvements in public transportation, pedestrian, and bicycle infrastructure that are associated with TOD and related policies may improve these reductions within Dhaka and other developing cities. However, TOD has also been found to be a major contributor to the urban heat island effect in Brisbane both having higher temperature and more rapidly increasing temperatures than non-TOD areas. This difference has been linked to TOD having a larger portion of non-porous land and less natural spaces, which must be considered when planning TOD.

=== Economic ===
TOD, specifically along light rail transit lines, have been seen to increase the amount of new businesses in Phoenix within one mile of a station, with businesses in the knowledge, service, and retail industries experiencing 88%, 40%, and 24% more new starts respectively than non-TOD areas. However, a decrease in manufacturing facilities has also been noted in TOD; similar results are likely to be seen in other U.S. cities. The value of condominiums in San Diego generally increases with decreasing distance from light rail transit stations, increasing walkability of neighborhoods, and increasing available services. This points to TOD as a preferable style of neighborhood to people, showing that market-driven creation of TOD neighborhoods may be possible in U.S. metropolitan areas. Resident expenses in TOD have been shown to be lower in well developed areas in spite of the generally higher rental costs due to lower energy use and travel costs, in Los Angeles the savings are around $3100 per year for one household.

TOD tends to increase nearby property values and reduce household transportation costs by lowering automobile dependence and parking expenses. These gains have prompted the use of land value capture mechanisms, including land value taxes, betterment taxes, and tax increment financing to recover a portion of the value created by public transit investment and reinvest it into capital costs and system expansion. When captured revenues are directed back into infrastructure, they can create a virtuous cycle of value creation and reinvestment that supports long-term system viability. However, these mechanisms raise equity concerns, as special assessments must be limited to areas where property owners both benefit from transit and are financially able to pay, while TOD-induced land value gains can displace low-income residents absent affordability safeguards.

=== Social ===
The studies on social impacts of TOD can be classified into three aspects. Behavioral impacts, psychological impacts and social impacts related to TOD induced gentrification and social inequality The social impact of TOD is categorized into three aspects:

- Behavioral impacts that are related to the effect on car use and travel behavior. First, since lowering car dependency and car ownership is one of the major goals of TOD, the existing studies consistently showed that TOD was negatively associated with car ownership. Other studies focus on the influence of TOD on residents’ travel behaviors. Though it seems self-evident that residents living in TOD areas are easier and thus more likely to travel by public transport, the existence of residential differences and the TOD-reduced gentrification make the linkages between TOD and public travel trips complex.
- Psychological impacts related to the subjective well-being and other sentiments. Studies on the psychological impacts of TOD mainly focus on subjective well-being, especially satisfaction with the travel domain and the life in general. First, a series of studies have examined the effects of TOD on travel satisfaction. While traveling by public transit is usually less pleasant compared with driving or active travel, TOD as a well-defined transit area is likely to generate more comfortable traveling experiences. Likewise, residents living within the TOD area tended to be more satisfied with public commuting. Nonetheless, since travel is an important life domain, satisfaction with public transport system is expected to significantly contribute to overall wellbeing.
- Impacts related to social inequality and TOD-induced gentrification. TOD is usually associated with regeneration of the old urban land use and increasing housing values, it may crowd out the low-income groups and cause large-scale residential mobility, significant neighborhood change and considerable upgrading of the TOD areas. Accordingly, TOD-induced gentrification is an emerging topic in transportation research in the recent decade.

== Reception ==
One criticism of transit-oriented development is that it has the potential to spur gentrification in low-income areas. In some cases, TOD can raise the housing costs of formerly affordable neighborhoods, pushing low- and moderate-income residents farther away from jobs and transit. When this happens, TOD projects can disrupt low-income neighborhoods. This can be very concerning due to the fact that lower income people tend to use (and need) transit more than higher income people.

When executed with equity in mind, however, TOD has the potential to benefit low- and moderate-income (LMI) communities: it can link workers to employment centers, create construction and maintenance jobs, and has the potential to encourage investment in areas that have suffered neglect and economic depression. Moreover, it is well recognized that neighborhood development restrictions, while potentially in the immediate neighborhood's best interest, contribute to regional undersupply of housing and drive up the cost of housing in general across a region. TOD reduces the overall cost of housing in a region by contributing to the housing supply, and therefore generally improves equity in the housing market. TOD also reduces transportation costs, which can have a greater impact on LMI households since they spend a larger share of their income on transportation relative to higher-income households. This frees up household income that can be used on food, education, or other necessary expenses. Low-income people are also less likely to own personal vehicles and therefore more likely to depend exclusively on public transportation to get to and from work, making reliable access to transit a necessity for their economic success. In addition, public housing can also be transit-oriented.

== History ==
TOD began in 1993 with the publication of Peter Calthorpe's book The Next American Metropolis. Calthorpe and his colleagues based their theory on the ideals of the Garden city movement.

A transit city is a type of city designed around the use of public transport. In such cities, urban development is centered around rail stations or tramlines.

The transit city emerged in the industrial world around 1850, due to the advent of new transport technologies - the steam train and electric tram. This facilitated faster travel, leading to larger cities, although most locations still remained within walking or bicycle distance. During the period from 1850 to 1940, it was the dominant type of city in industrialized countries. In less-developed parts of the world, however, mass transit technology was not adopted as greatly, with many cities remaining walking cities up until the 1970s onwards, when they transformed directly into automotive cities.

== See also ==
General:

- Integrated ticketing
- Principles of intelligent urbanism
- Smart growth
- Sustainable transport
- Trail-oriented development
- Urban consolidation
- Value capture

Urban planning by mode prioritised:

- Automotive city – Urban planning prioritising automobiles
- Bicycle-friendly – Urban planning prioritising cycling
- Carfree city – Urban area absent of motor vehicles
- Complete streets – Transportation policy and design approach
- Living street – Traffic calming in spaces shared between road users
- Pedestrian village – Urban planning for mixed-use areas prioritising pedestrians
- Street hierarchy – Urban planning restricting through traffic of automobiles

Transit:

- Streetcar suburb – Residential community developed by streetcar lines
- Transit mall – Urban street reserved for public transit, bicycles, and pedestrians
- Transit metropolis – Regional transit development
- Transit-proximate development – Urban planning prioritising automobiles and transit
- Transit village – Urban planning prioritising transit and pedestrians
