= Integrated transport network =

System of seamless, integrated transport

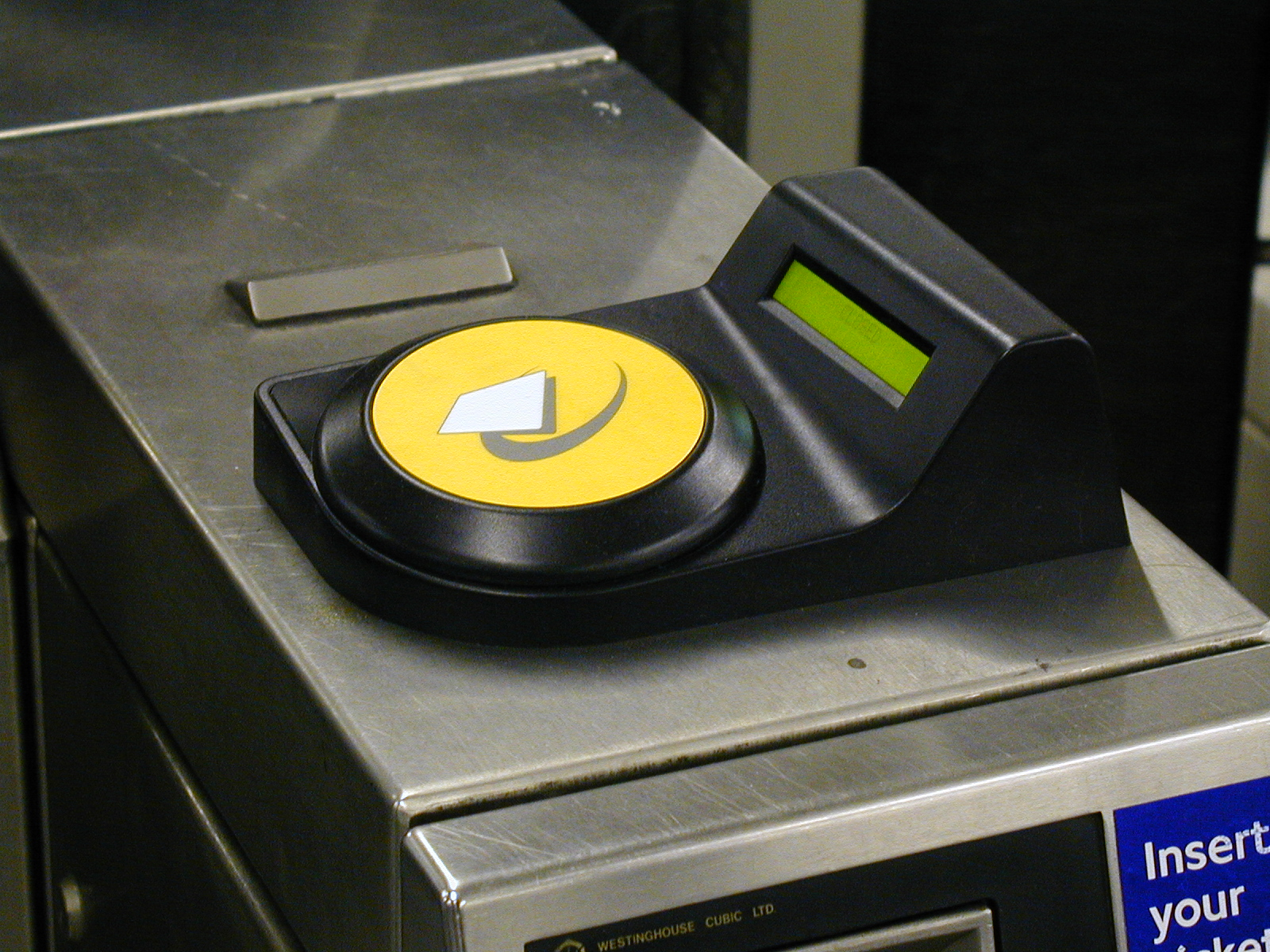
London's Oyster card system is an example of an integrated transport network

An integrated transport network is a transport system that allows travellers to have a seamless, rapid public transport experience. Journeys are optimised to have as little interchange as possible, services are scheduled to minimise waiting times, and ticketing or other administrative tasks are reduced to the minimum. The concept may be applied to single transport modes or to combinations.

== History ==
One of the first integrated transport networks was the Rede Integrada de Transporte in Curitiba, Brazil. Opened in 1974, the RIT was one of the first systems to merge multiple aspects of a metropolitan transport network into one.

In the UK, the concept of "integrated transport" was first publicised by Tony Blair's 1997 Labour government in a 1998 white paper, titled "A New Deal for Transport: Better for everyone". A response to growing concerns around traffic congestion, it suggested that improving and better "integrating" existing public transport systems would reduce overall congestion.

== Planning ==
In order to achieve an integrated network including different modes of transport, all agencies responsible for the various modes must work effectively together. If they are fragmented, and especially if they are in direct competition with each other, effective joint working is unlikely.

== Traveller information ==
Prospective travellers must be able to access information about their possible journey. For public transport services, travellers should be able to access real-time information on services, or should (in high-use areas) be confident that the next service will arrive very shortly.

== See also ==
- Transit-oriented development
