= Transit-proximate development =

Urban planning prioritising automobiles and transit

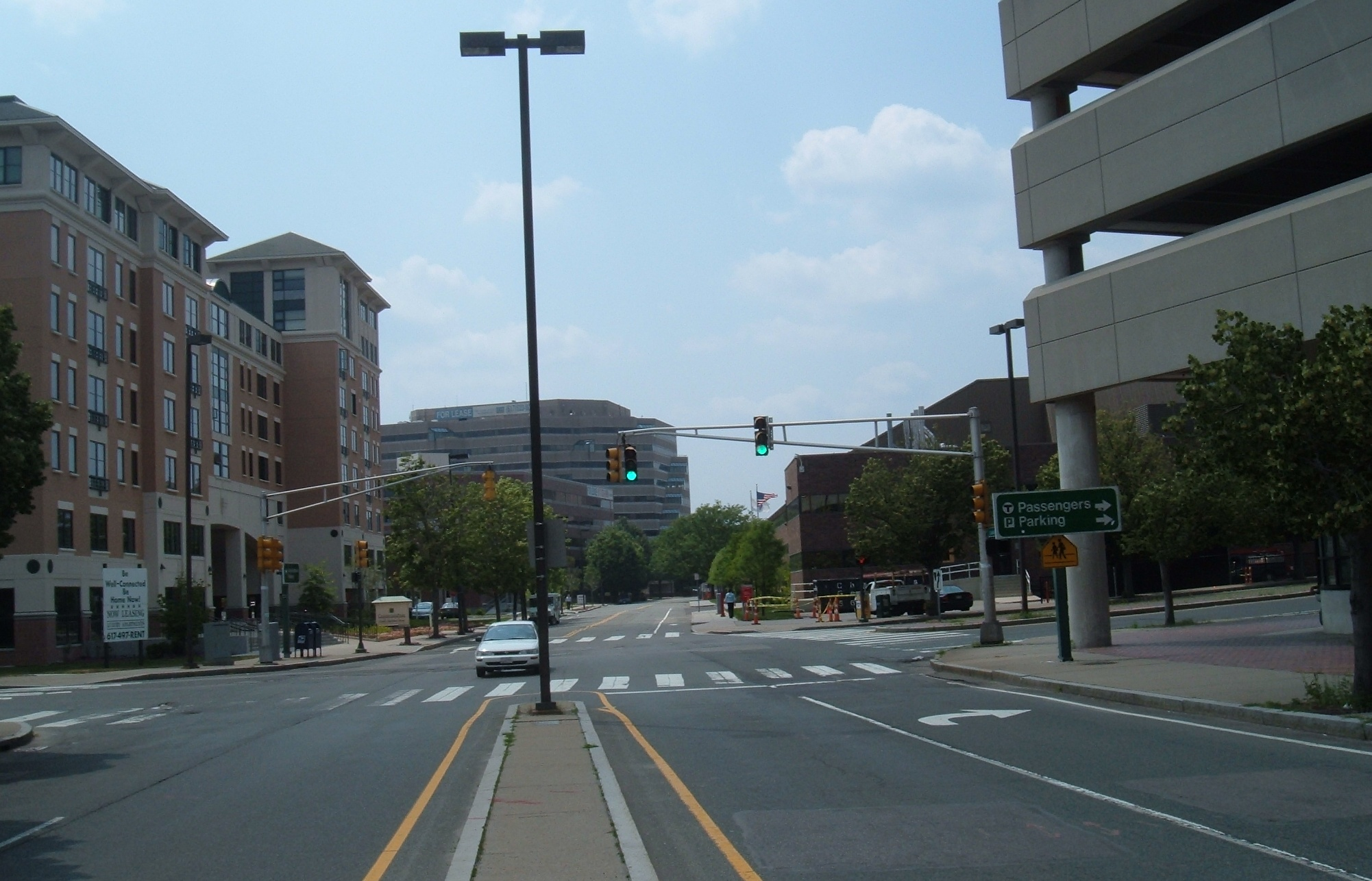
High density development in Cambridge, Massachusetts stimulated by Alewife subway station (right foreground) and TOD zoning. Note the extensive parking above the station, lack of on-street parking, long pedestrian crossing distances, and limited ground-level retail.

Transit-proximate development is a term used by some planning officials to describe (potentially dense) development that is physically near a public transport node (e.g. a bus station, train station or metro station). This type of development includes transit-oriented development, but, according to some planning officials, can also describe development that is not transit-oriented development. Thus, transit-proximate development can include results where, despite the location of dense development near transit, the development does not take full advantage of -- or fully encourage the use of -- the public transport node. For example, transit-proximate development could include buildings with extensive parking facilities typical of suburban locations, a lack of "mixed-use development" (housing, workplaces and shopping in the same place), or a lack of extensive pedestrian facilities that would make it easier for people to reach the public transport node.

== See also ==
- New Urbanism
- Smart growth
- Urban sprawl
- Transit-oriented development
- Principles of Intelligent Urbanism
- Transit village
- Streetcar suburb
- Value capture
