= Trail-oriented development =

Planning and development approach

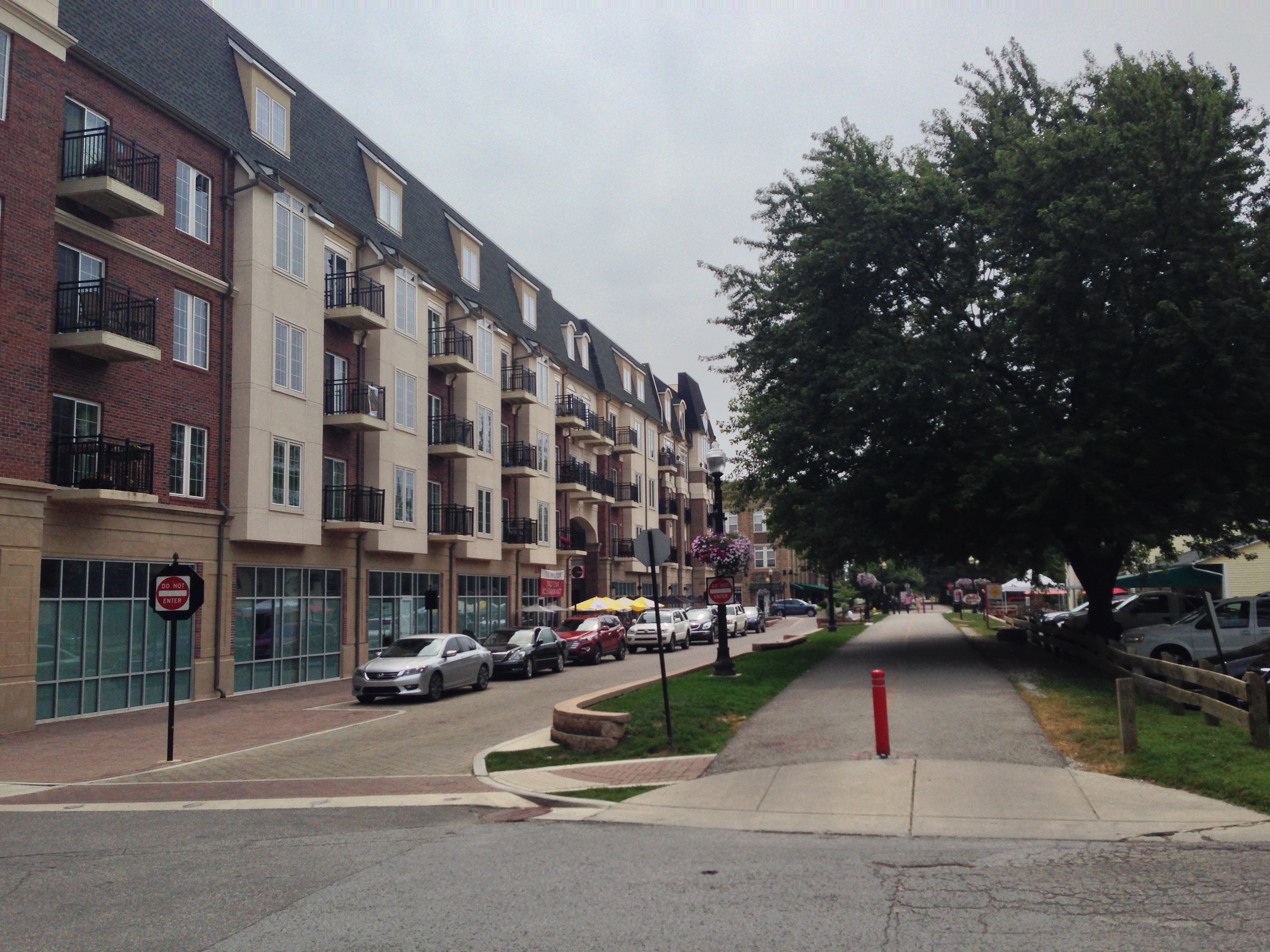
Development along trail

Trail-Oriented Development (TrOD) is a planning and development approach that focuses on integrating trails with nearby communities, businesses, and transportation systems. Similar to Transit-Oriented Development (TOD), TrOD encourages mixed-use, walkable, and bike-friendly environments centered around trail networks rather than transit hubs.

== Description ==
Trail-oriented development is an urban planning approach that integrates trails with nearby residential, commercial, and parks development. Trail-oriented development attempts to enhance connectivity, support local businesses, and create transitions between trails and adjacent properties through expanded amenities. Developments using a trail-oriented development approach may include bike and pedestrian features (such as additional bike parking), designs that complement the trail or trail users, focusing on serving trail users, or simply a focus on providing users transportation options.

== Impacts ==
An Urban Land Institute study found that trail-oriented development can have positive health outcomes and support real estate development with an overall positive return on investment. A study on the Mon River Trails System found that while trails can stimulate economic growth, they can also drive demand to a level that becomes a barrier for small businesses. The study suggests proper planning should focus on not just whether a trail will bring economic activity, but on the scale and type of the activity.

A study of the Indianapolis Cultural Trail showed an initial 2008 investment of $63M in the trail network resulted in an increase of approximately $1 billion in assessed property value by 2014, which grew to more than $3 billion in assessed property value by 2026. The Atlanta Beltline built starting in 2005 with $1 billion in public and philanthropic financial support, has seen $14 billion in private investment and $23 billion of economic output either directly or through spillover effects. The many trail-oriented businesses and residents along the Beltline include approximately 4500 affordable housing units, many market rate units, and approximately 34,000 jobs supported in the area.

== See also ==
- Accessibility
- Bicycle-friendly
- Green infrastructure
- Real estate development
- Sustainable urbanism
- Sustainable urban infrastructure
- Urban economics
- Urban studies
- Urban design
