= North–South Trunk Line (RIT) =

The North–South Trunk Line is a bus rapid transit (BRT) service that runs from Santa Cândida Transit Center, in northeast Curitiba, to Pinheirinho Transit Center, in south side Curitiba. Two express routes run through this line and it is supplemented by a limited route ("Direct Line") that serves only certain stops. It is part of Curitiba's Rede Integrada de Transporte transportation system.

== History ==
The first express route began operating in 1974, linking Santa Cândida in north side Curitiba to Generoso Marques Square, in downtown. A dedicated bus lane was built for this route, with bus stops 400 meters (1/4 mile) apart from each other. Special amenities, such as newsstands, payphones, maps and exclusive bus shelters were introduced to each bus stop.

Twenty buses operated the line when it first opened and they had their own color-scheme to identify them as express buses, rather than local ones. Red is still the color of express buses, the same as when first introduced.

Throughout the years, the line was extended (first to Portão Transit Center and later to Capão Raso and Pinheirinho transit centers) and received upgrades, like articulated buses and "tube-stations". In the early '90s, the first double-articulated buses ("biarticulados") were developed in partnership between URBS and Volvo and later started operating on this line.

Still in the 1990s, a point-to-point route ("Direct Line" or "Linha Direta") was introduced, with limited stops and serving only its dedicated tube-stations, linking both ends of the line, Santa Cândida in the north and Pinheirinho in the south.

== Route description ==
The line, between Santa Cândida and Pinheiro transit centers is 18.5 km (11.5 mi) long. One express route links Santa Cândida and Capão Raso (route 203) and the other express route (603) connects Pinheirinho to Rui Barbosa Square, in downtown Curitiba. The two routes overlap between Oswaldo Cruz Square station and Capão Raso Transit Center. During peak hours, buses run every 3 minutes on route 203 every 4 minutes on route 603. On weekdays non-peak hours, buses run every 5 to 9 minutes on both routes. On weekends, buses run every 9 minutes on route 203 and every 14 minutes on route 603. Double-articulated buses with five doors on the right side operate on this route.

A "Direct Line" service (route 204) connects Santa Cândida and Pinheirinho transit centers. It stops in a limited number of stations and transfers to the express routes are available at 5 transit centers (Santa Cândida, Boa Vista, Cabral, Portão and Pinheirinho). Other routes connect to 203 at the all tube-stations along the way. Standard size buses with doors on the left side operate on this route.

In downtown, Universidade Federal do Paraná and XV de Novembro street pedestrian mall's east end are accessible from routes 203 (at Estação Central) and 204 (at Círculo Militar), although these stations are about 300 m (1,000 ft) apart from each other.

== Transfer points ==
Six transit centers are served by the North–South Trunk Line, which allow riders to connect to other routes for free. Praça Eufrásio Correia station allows free transfer to the East–West Trunk Line, but it is restricted by the direction of travel (i.e. northbound connects only to eastbound buses and westbound buses only connect to southbound and vice versa).

Other important RIT routes connect to the North–South Trunk Line, such as, Interbairros II, the Direct Line Inter 2 (at Cabral, Portão and Capão Raso transit centers). Other municipalities in the metro area have routes that are fed directly into this trunk line, like some from Colombo (at Santa Cândida, Cabral and Capão Raso transit centers), Almirante Tamandaré (at Cabral transit center), Araucária (at Portão, Capão Raso and Pinheirinho transit centers) and Fazenda Rio Grande (at Pinheirinho Transit Center).
