= Erasto Gaertner Hospital =

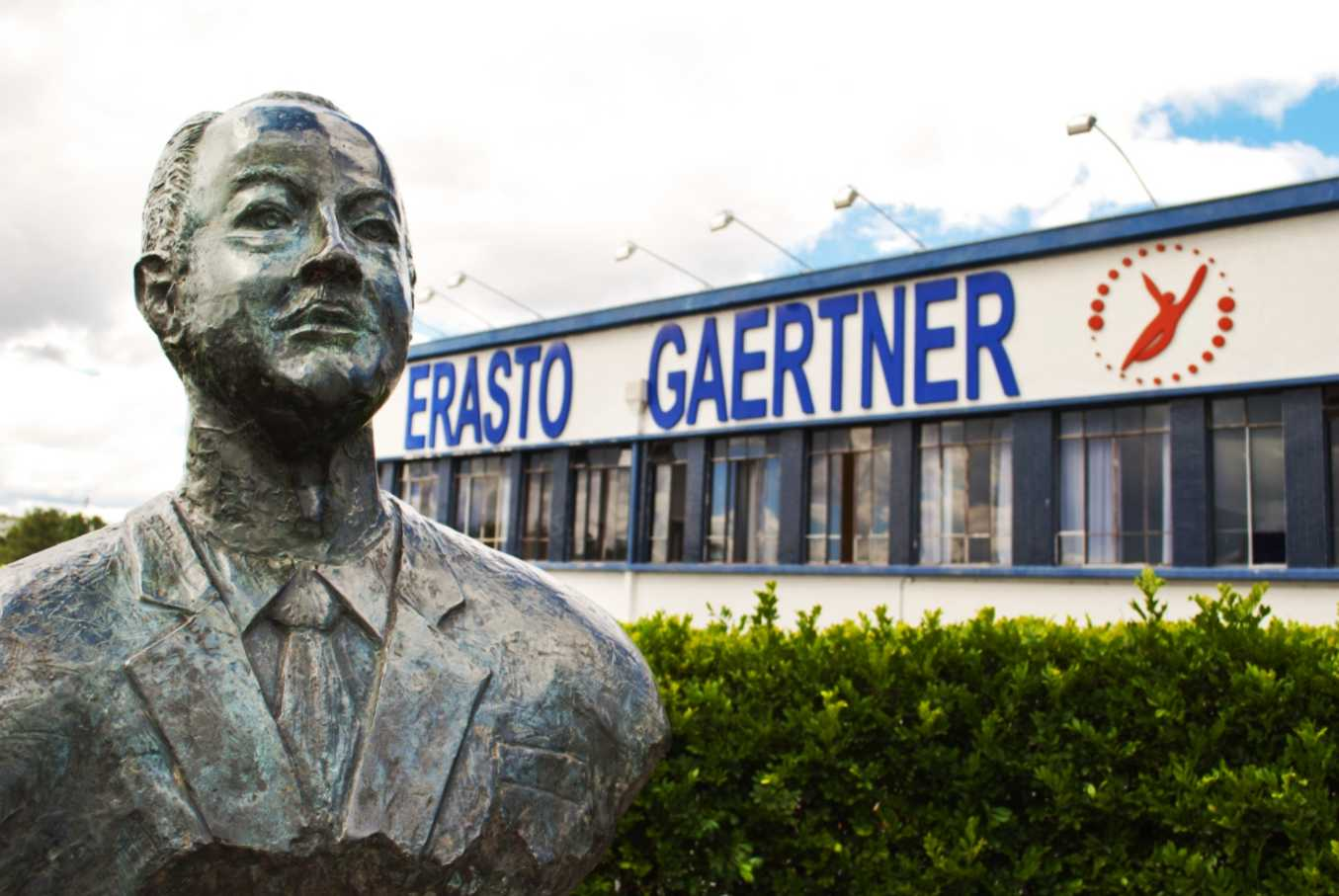

Geography
- Location: Curitiba, Paraná, Brazil
- Coordinates: 25°27′12″S 49°14′20″W

Organisation
- Type: Cancer Hospital

Services
- Beds: 153

History
- Founded: 11 June 1955; 71 years ago

Links
- Website: http://erastogaertner.com.br

The Erasto Gaertner Hospital is a health institution in Curitiba, in the Brazilian state of Paraná. It specializes in the clinical and surgical treatment of patients with oncological diseases.

== History ==
The Erasto Gaertner Hospital was created on the initiative of Dr. Erasto Gaertner, who, on 2 January 1952, donated a land of 62,500 square metres (673,000 sq ft) to the Paraná League for Combat of Cancer (Liga Paranaense de Combate ao Cancer - LPCC) for the construction of what today is the Erasto Gaertner Hospital. On 11 June 1955, the hospital's cornerstone was placed.

Before being officially inaugurated, patients with cancer were treated since 1970 when Paulo Pimentel, governor of Paraná State, donated a cobalt pump, that allowed 47 sessions of radiotherapy per day. The local community and volunteers gathered resources to finalize and effectively inaugurate the Erasto Gaertner Hospital on 8 December 1972.

In the beginning, the Erasto Gaertner offered basic clinical and surgical care, attending few patients in an operating room, with a radiotherapy device and the cobalt pump.

Nowadays, the hospital is considered the largest cancer treatment center in South Brazil.
